= Sedimentary budget =

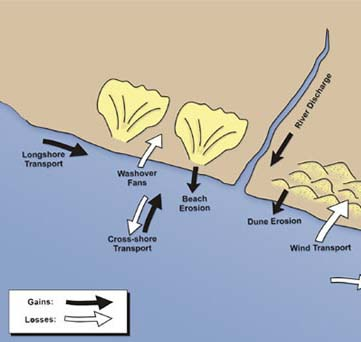
Diagram of accretion and erosion of sediments in a coastal system. Black arrows indicate accretion, and white arrows indicate erosion.

Sedimentary budgets are a coastal management tool used to analyze and describe the different sediment inputs (sources) and outputs (sinks) on the coasts, which is used to predict morphological change in any particular coastline over time. Within a coastal environment the rate of change of sediment is dependent on the amount of sediment brought into the system versus the amount of sediment that leaves the system. These inputs and outputs of sediment then equate to the total balance of the system and more than often reflect the amounts of erosion or accretion affecting the morphology of the coast.

To assess the sedimentary budget the coast has to be divided into two separate morphologies, commonly known as littoral cells and compartments. Sediment compartments can usually be defined as two rocky barriers which mark the ends of a beach and have a fixed sediment budget, although usually leaky to some extent. Littoral cells can either be free or fixed and can occupy a hierarchy of scales, from individual rip cells to entire beaches.

There are various types of natural sources and sinks within a coastal system. Sediment sources can include river transport, sea cliff erosion and longshore drift into an area. Sediment sinks can include longshore drift of sediment away from an area and sediment deposition into an estuary.

Anthropogenic activities can also influence sedimentary budgets; in particular damming of a river and in stream gravel mining of a river bed can reduce the sediment source to the coast. In contrast beach nourishment can increase sediment source.

In 1966, Bowen and Inman defined a littoral cell and separated sediment inputs, accretion by longshore drift and outputs.

Sedimentary budgets are used to assist in the management of beach erosion by trying to show the present sediment movement and forecast future sediment movement.

== Feedback mechanisms ==
In order to understand the sedimentary budget of a coastal environment it is important to know the different types of feedback that can determine whether there is stability. When a beach environment is effected by wind, wave and tidal energy it responds with either positive or negative feedback which determines whether the system is balanced and in equilibrium.

Negative feedback is a stabilising mechanism acting to oppose changes to coastal morphology and establish equilibrium. A coastal environment in equilibrium is able to dissipate or reflect incoming energy without the occurrence of sediment input or output and change to morphology. For example; when a beach in equilibrium erodes during a storm it forms an offshore bar that in turn forces waves to break over it. By doing this the waves lose a lot of energy and dissipate before reaching the shoreline, significantly reducing further erosion. When the storm calms, the bar is then re-worked back on to the beach.

In contrast positive feedback pushes a coastal system away from equilibrium by modifying its morphology until a threshold is reached, whereby a different type of response occurs. For example; if a storm event was to breach the foredune of a beach that is not in equilibrium, a vulnerable area would be created, which in turn would become susceptible to the formation of a blowout due to wind exploiting the absence of vegetation.

== Sediment compartments and littoral cells ==
Compartmentalisation of the shore occurs where there are major obstacles or objects, especially headlands on deeply embayed coasts. The beaches that are the most enclosed are commonly known as pocket beaches. On these types of beaches the volume of sand remains constant and are closed compartments. Littoral cells can be defined as sediment within a coast that is circulated e.g. rip currents. Littoral cells usually develop on coast which are not impeded by headlands and where longshore currents are allowed to develop.

Identifying littoral cells is crucial to determine the sediment budget of sandy coasts. In south-west Western Australia, large cuspate forelands and rocky headlands are thought to be boundaries for littoral cells. Boundaries of littoral cells have been defined using tracer studies of sediment movement, geomorphological observation and sedimentological description, heavy mineral sourcing, and analysis of the spatial distribution of wave flux along the shore.

Littoral cells are usually an area where changes in the volume of sediment directly affects changes in the coastline, and ideally they are defined to minimise longshore sediment exchange with other littoral cells, for example, a pocket beach surrounded by rocky headlands (which are presumed to exclude sediments). Sub-cells are usually defined to better measure the sediment budget of a coast with varying rates of accretion and erosion. The landward boundary of a littoral cell is usually the foot of a dune or cliff, however, the seaward boundary is difficult to define as mechanisms of sediment transport here are poorly understood. There are three kinds of boundaries between littoral cells: longshore, landward, and seaward; across which sediment may enter the littoral cell or leave it by various processes. It is important to identify which processes operate on a particular littoral cell and also important to identify sediment sources and sinks, as by measuring the sediment gained or lost by these sources and sinks, a sediment budget can be determined.

=== Sources ===
==== Rivers ====
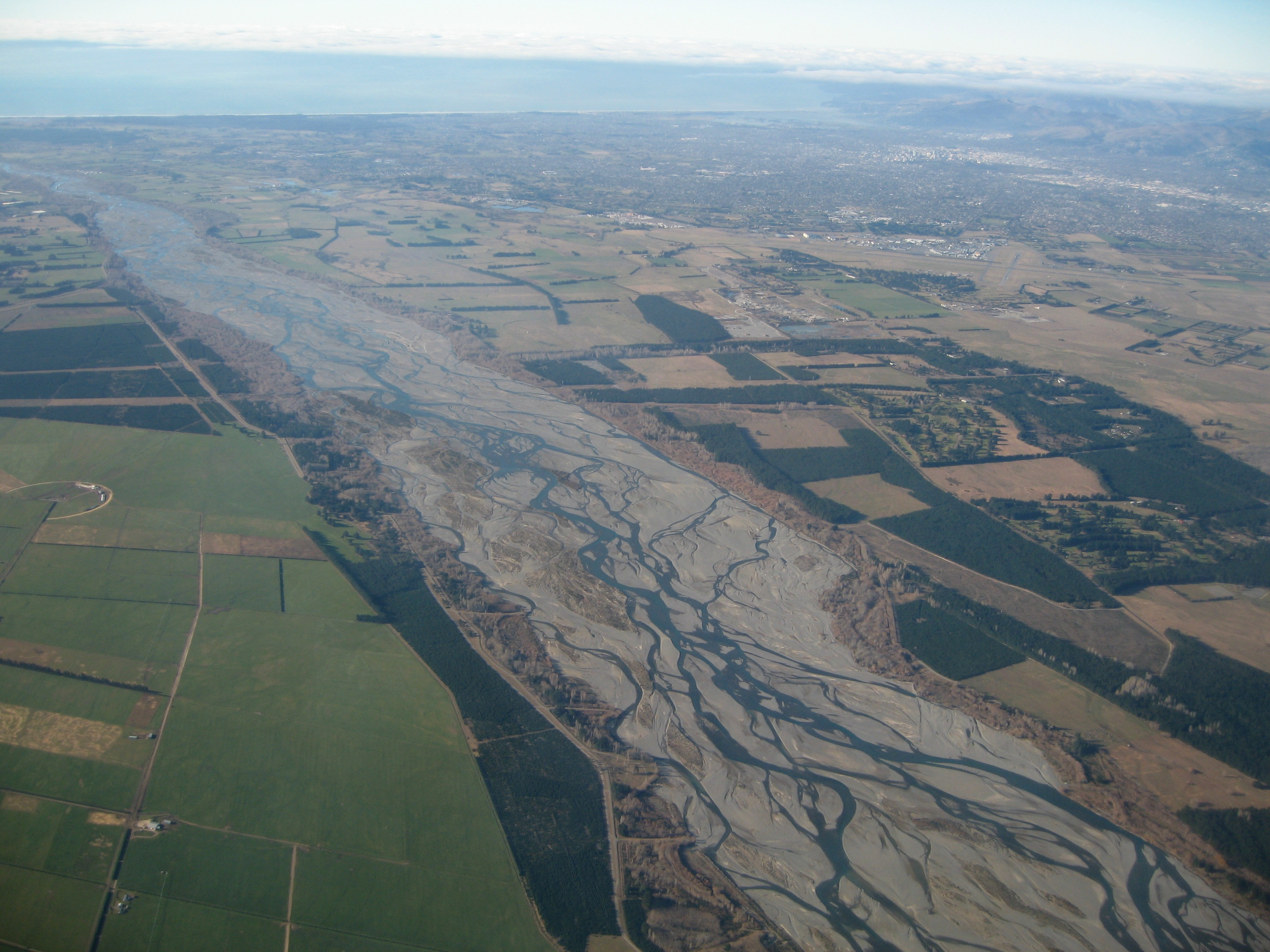
The Waimakariri River on the coast of Canterbury, New Zealand produces 77% of sediment supplied to the Pegasus Bay coastline.

Rivers are major point sources of sediment contribution to the coastal sedimentary budget, this being particularly true of coasts with a steep gradient, where rivers directly dump their sediments at the coast. Coasts with a low gradient may lose river sediment to estuaries. Sediment delivery to the shoreline can be very intermittent mostly occurring during floods with the increase in flow typically creating an increase in sediment supplied to the coast. Some rivers are referred to as ‘large’ because they produce high amounts of sediment for which to nourish the coastal environment. For example, the Waimakariri River on the coast of Canterbury, New Zealand produces 77% of sediment supplied to the Pegasus Bay coastline. This is not always the case with some rivers referred to as ‘small’ because they struggle to supply enough sediment to keep their coastlines from eroding, for example, the Rakaia River South of Banks Peninsula in Canterbury, New Zealand.

The construction of river dams for flood control and hydropower reduces sediment supply to many coastlines due to the trapping of sediment and the decrease in flood peaks and flood intensity. In places such as Southern California of the United States, in particular the San Luis Rey River, dams are built to control flooding of properties along the river. Ironically, in doing so, this is contributing to the damage of coastal properties due to a lack of sediment produced to protect the beaches. Another example is the Aswan Dam constructed on the Nile River, Egypt in 1964. Prior to the construction of the Aswan Dam, the Nile River delivered 60-180 million tonnes of sediment and water to the Mediterranean Sea every year. Sediment supply is now almost zero which has produced a significant imbalance to the near shore sedimentary budget, creating major erosion and shifting of sediment along the coast.

The effects of sediment trapping due to dams can be exacerbated when combined with other activities such as in-stream gravel mining. Excavation of gravel from a river bed forms pits within the channel profile which can trap much of the incoming bed load sediment, preventing or slowing it from reaching the coastline. Mining can also reducing the amount of overall sediment available for transport, especially when it occurs down stream from dams. For example; approximately 300,000 m^{3} of gravel is extracted from the San Luis Rey River in South California every year, which is almost 50 times more than the bedload sediment yield after the dam was built. Thus, removing more bedload sediment further decreases the sediment yield available to the coast.

The removal of natural vegetation for cultivation and land use can increase soil erosion resulting in an increase in sediment yield transported by rivers to the coast. For example; in Westland New Zealand this has had a cumulative effect with clear felling of trees increasing in river sediment yield up to eight times.

==== Sea cliff erosion ====
Sea cliff erosion is a large source of sediment to many coastal sedimentary budgets, initiated by many different processes including wave attack, rainfall and groundwater seepage. Cliff erosion can be influenced by rising sea levels and is magnified with storm surge events. An example of cliff erosion is the erosion of large Pleistocene alluvial fans that span the length of the Canterbury Bight, situated north of the Waitaki River in New Zealand. The erosion of these cliffs, due to high energy wave environments contributes 70% of the overall material supplied to these beaches.

==== Storms ====
Although less frequently observed than river transport and sea cliff erosion, storms may account for a large percentage of coastal sedimentary budgets. Following Hurricane Katrina and Hurricane Rita in 2005, over 131 × 10^{6} metric tons of sediment were deposited along the Louisiana and eastern Texas Gulf Coast. Study of the western Louisiana coastal wetlands found hurricanes appear to be the "overwhelming pathway" by which sediment is deposited in that location, accounting for amounts of sediment far greater than amounts deposited by the local river systems. Based annualized estimates of magnitude of sediment deposition, hurricanes have been found to deposit hundreds of times more sediment in these coastal wetland regions than man-made river diversions intended to redirect river-transported sediment to starving wetland systems. For salt marsh wetlands, particularly those of coastal Louisiana, sediment accumulation from hurricanes is "sufficient" to account for the entire inorganic sedimentary budget.

=== Sinks ===
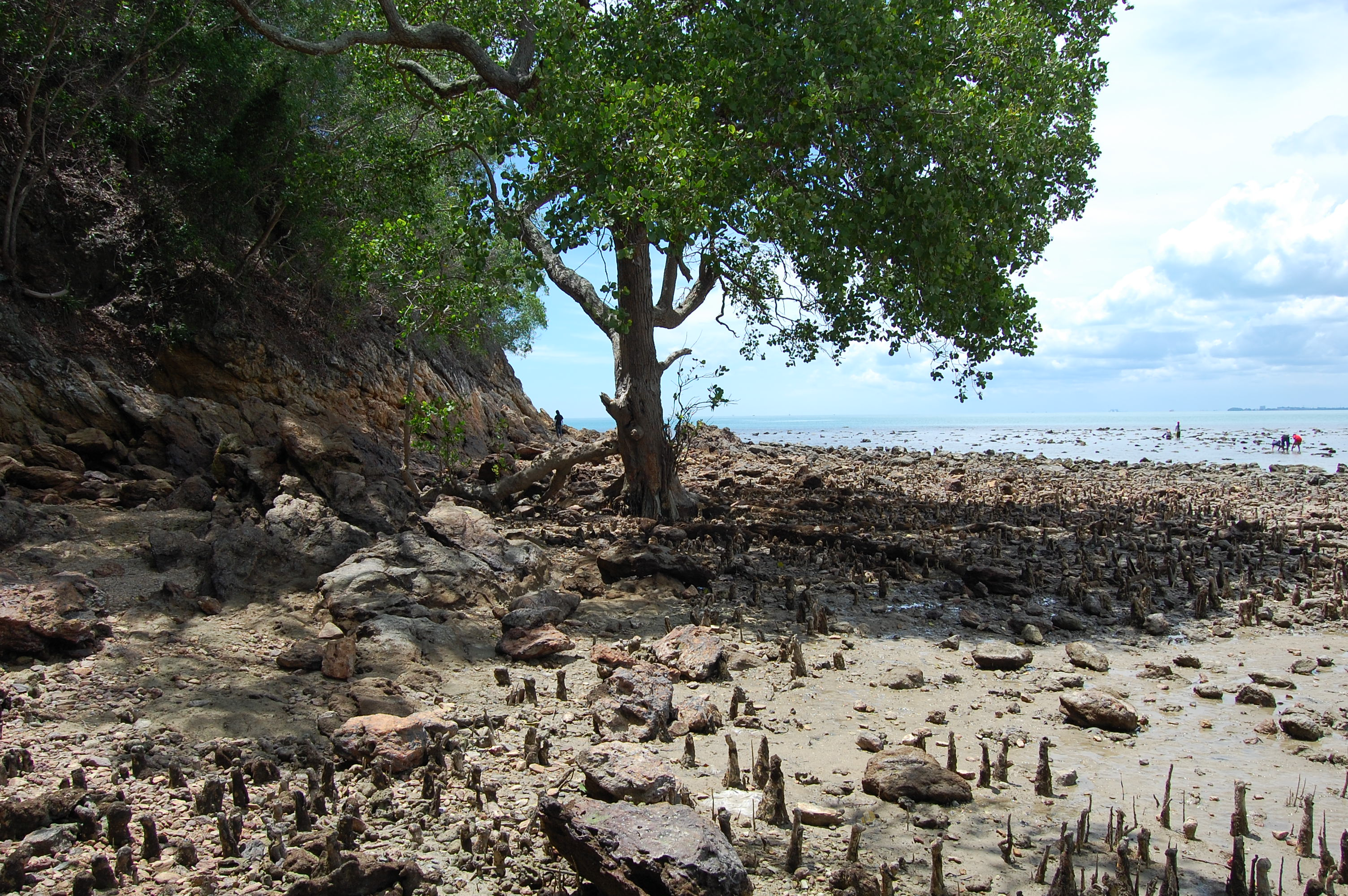
A mangrove can trap sediment with its aerial root structures.

==== Estuaries ====
Estuaries are an example of a coastal sink in that they tend to trap sediment which can be due to tidal circulations and the mixing of fresh and salt water, the injection of river sediment and the presence of mangroves. As the tide rises and falls water and sediment is pumped into the estuary. Because salt water and sediment particles are heavier than fresh water they tend to be carried the bottom until the sediment sinks to the floor and is trapped within the estuary. The movement of sands and offshore material into an estuary generally depends on the direction of longshore drift and the movement of bottom waters across the continental shelf. Estuaries can often trap a lot of coarse bedload sediments that are fed down rivers, intercepting them before they reach the coast. The North Island of New Zealand experiences sediment sinks into estuaries often, enhanced by the presence of mangroves. Mangroves are sediment hungry and trap a lot of suspended sediment with their complex aerial root structure, thus functioning as land builders.

==== Aeolian transport ====
Sand that is blown by the wind inland to form sand dunes usually develop on shorelines where there is suitably strong winds. This can be a major sink for the sediment budget of a shoreline.

== Longshore drift ==
Diagram demonstrating longshore drift

Longshore drift of sediment is important for distributing sediment along the coast, and is considered one of the most important mechanisms. The longshore drift of sediment can be considered both a source and a sink due to the fact that in some case it can add sediment to a coastline but in others transport sediment away from a coastline. An example of both extremes of longshore drift can be found on the Canterbury coastline in New Zealand, either side of Banks Peninsular. Both the Waimakariri River in the north and the Canterbury Bight in the south of the Banks Peninsula provide large amounts of sediment respectively. The difference is the sediment supplied by the Waimakariri River is a source for the coast's New Brighton spit due to the reversal of southern currents transporting sediment to the south. In contrast the Canterbury Bight has a combination of high energy environments and strong southern longshore currents that transport large amounts of sediment north, which can be classified as a sink, putting a deficit to the coasts sedimentary budget. As a result, there is erosion of the Canterbury Bight and a predominantly balanced New Brighton Spit.

Models have been developed for measuring longshore drift which can assist in determining a sedimentary budget, if they are integrated over the correct timescale.

The sediment budget takes into consideration sediment sources and sinks within a system. This sediment can come from any source with examples of sources and sinks consisting of:

- Rivers
- Lagoons
- Eroding land sources
- Artificial sources e.g. nourishment
- Artificial sinks e.g. mining/extraction
- Offshore transport
- Deposition of sediment on shore

This sediment then enters the coastal system and is transported by longshore drift. A good example of the sediment budget and longshore drift working together in the coastal system is inlet ebb-tidal shoals, which store sand that has been transported by long shore transport. As well as storing sand these systems may also transfer or by pass sand into other beach systems, therefore inlet ebb-tidal shoal systems provide a good sources and sinks for the sediment budget.

== Cross-shore movement ==
Wave swash and currents can impact significantly on the sediment budget, although it is difficult to measure. Swash can be either an erosive or accretion process depending on many factors such as the sand texture and the individual wave itself. Although during fair weather the impact of swash is negligible, during storms the sea level can rise high enough to erode dunes and cliffs, dumping large quantities of sediment into the littoral cell, which can only be given back to the dune by aeolian transport. Where storm surge causes sediments to be deposited on the land from the littoral cell, they can form washover fans or open a new tidal inlet which transports sediment away from the littoral cell.

== Management ==
=== Coastal nourishment ===
When a coastal environment is in sediment deficit, anthropogenic sediment nourishment is one way in which a balanced sedimentary budget can be maintained. This type of coastal erosion management has been adopted all over the world in order to preserve and protect. An example of this is at Mount Maunganui beach in the North Island of New Zealand which had been experiencing erosion, resulting in coastal dune retreat of almost 20 m. When ongoing dredging at the entrance to the Tauranga Harbour began, it was decided that the sediment removed would be used to re-nourish the Mt. Manganui beach. The sediment was deposited in the nearshore zone promoting beach accretion by offshore berm emplacement. Results show that most of the 80,000 m^{3} of sediment added to the nearshore zone made it to ashore to re-nourish the beach and even out the past sediment deficit. Nourishment of a coast can be regarded as a fast fix option to reversing a sediment deficit; however, it is important that nourishment is on-going in order to ensure the sedimentary budget remains balanced.

=== Coastal protection ===
When protecting the coastline it is important to understand how the sedimentary budget can be affected when implementing appropriate coastal protecting techniques. Often management plans for coastal erosion have seen the use of ‘hard’ engineering structures as a means of protecting the coastline from recession. In particular groynes which are used to trap the longshore drift of sediment that often deprives a beach. Groynes have the ability to change the coast's sediment budget, accreting up drift beaches but at the same time starving down drift beaches. This management approach is not used so much these days, with modern knowledge of coastal dynamics promoting the use of ‘soft’, natural approaches such as nourishment and preservation of natural systems such as dunes.

=== Coastal planning ===
Being able to incorporate the sedimentary budget into a coastal management plan is becoming critical, especially in today's world where the majority of populations are living and owning property very close to the coast. One of the essential components drawn from sediment budget is being able to predict the morphological change that is likely to occur to a coastline over time, especially when creating plans associated with major environmental change such as sea level rise. Incorporating a sediment budget into a coastal plan has been recognised as highly important in the Hawke's Bay of New Zealand for finding information relating to hazard zones, beach property protection, and coastal erosion as well as assess the successfulness of current management strategies. The major setback with using the sediment budget for management and what is probably the underlining issue regarding the sediment budget is its complexity.
