= Coastal sediment supply =

Transport of sediment to the beach environment

Coastal sediment supply is the transport of sediment to the beach environment by both fluvial and aeolian transport. While aeolian transport plays a role in the overall sedimentary budget for the coastal environment, it is paled in comparison to the fluvial supply which makes up 95% of sediment entering the ocean. When sediment reaches the coast it is then entrained by longshore drift and littoral cells until it is accreted upon the beach or dunes.

While it is acknowledged that storm systems are the driver behind coastal erosion. There is a general consensus that human activity, mainly dam and reservoir impoundments on rivers are the cause of indirect human related coastal erosion, along with other local scale effects such as: land use change, irrigation, gravel extraction and river re-alignment.

== Rate of supply ==
Worldwide, rivers discharge approximately 35,000 km^{3} of freshwater into the ocean annually. Transported in this freshwater is 15 to 20 billion tons of sediment. This sediment load is not proportionally distributed across the world's rivers, with Asian and Oceanic regions being among those most significantly affected by changing sediment regimes, as they account for 75% of this global sediment budget.

These changing rates of supply/replenishment from the fluvial environment are a dominant factor in controlling the rate of coastal erosion. While sediment supply is actually increasing, due to increased erosion rates, the supply of this sediment to the coastal environment is decreasing.

== Factors that influence sediment supply ==
Fluvial systems are key elements for operating Earth surface change because they convey most of the global fluxes of water and sediment from land to oceans. Human activities can affect the discharge of water and sediment from a river to the coastal environment in many ways. Deforestation and agriculture, as well as urbanization can increase the erosion of a river basin by as much as an order of magnitude. Freshly exposed soil is much less likely to resist erosion by rainfall or moving water, especially in areas where land is often used for agriculture and precipitation is high.

Since the 1950s the number of dams in the world has increased more than sevenfold. The creation of reservoirs has significantly reduced the sediment yield of many rivers as sediment that was entrained in the flow is stopped by a manmade barrier and the energy required to transport the material is lost, the sediment is no longer entrained as there is no flow or the flow is too slow.

Removal of water for irrigation reduces river flow and also plays its part in reducing the sediment carrying capacity of a river. Agricultural and farming practices often require intensive irrigation systems to achieve appropriate production levels. This creates a high demand on waterways as water is diverted and used to irrigate crops and pasture. This decreases the flow rate within the river system, which in turn lowers the sediment carrying capacity of the river as the energy within is less. Sediment is deposited along the reach of the river and takes much longer to reach the coastal zone if at all.

== Effects on the coast ==
This changing coastal sediment supply regime leads to predominantly erosional outcomes but it is a case by case, river by river scenario. There are areas where the coastal sediment flux has increased and accretion of the shoreline has been evident. The effects of changing sediment flux can be very localised but pronounced, below are examples within the Bohai Sea. The Yellow River delta is undergoing an accretion phase while 200 km across the sea the Laun River area has experienced increased erosion rates along the coastline as a result of the changing sediment input.

=== Accretion ===
The Yellow River transports an order of magnitude more sediment than it did prior to widespread cultivation of the loess plateaus in northern China, about 2400 years ago. One implication of this large increase in the sediment discharge of Asian rivers has been the increased shoreward accretion of some deltaic areas over the past several millennia. The Yellow River Delta has accreted hundreds of square kilometers over the past few decades. Building the coastline at a rate greater than sea level rise and depositing sediment faster than erosional processes can remove it. Mankind in Asia is occupying land areas that may not have existed if not for the increased upstream erosion and delivery of the sediment to the coastal environment.

=== Erosion ===
Coastal erosion/retreat has wide-ranging implications for human habitat. with 45% of the world's population living within 100 km of a coastline. The decline of sediment supply to the coast generally results in increased rates of erosion as there is no nourishment of the beach profile. Over time as storm systems ‘attack’ the coastline removing sediment to offshore bars or from the system altogether a real issue develops in how to slow the advancing ocean and protect coastal developments.

=== Qinhuangadao coast ===
Since the completion of construction of two large dams on the Luan River in 1979, its annual sediment delivery to the Bohai Sea has been cut from 20.2 million tons to an annual sediment flux of only 1.9 million tons. This sharp reduction in sediment discharge has been accompanied by phase shift of the Luan River Delta into para-abandonment. This drop in sediment yield has inevitably altered the longshore transport equilibrium in the local coastal area. With prevailing northward winds, shoreline retreat rates north of the Luan River have increased from 1 m/y to 3.7 m/y over twenty-year period since dam construction, rapidly changing the morphology and beach profile via positive feedback until a new equilibrium was reached, at which the present retreat is back at its original 1 m/y. With a longshore drift equilibrium was reached within a new state.

=== Mississippi Delta ===
The effects of changing sediment flux were a definite compounding factor in the havoc brought upon New Orleans in 2005 by Hurricane Katrina. The Mississippi River Delta is slowly sinking due to natural compaction and its sediment supply from up river being greatly diminished by up to 50%, due to dam construction in the Mississippi Basin. The loss of sediment supply has resulted in subsidence of the delta and wetland reduction. Fresh sediment is not deposited at a rate fast enough for vegetation to grow on as sea level rises. The brackish conditions that are essential for vegetation growth on the delta are no longer. These coastal wetlands are vital for the diverse wildlife habitat that lives among them, and for protecting developed areas from storm surges, like the one experienced during Katrina.

== Solutions ==
=== Beach nourishment ===
This is a short-term fix for a long-term problem. It treats the immediate symptoms of coastal erosion by dumping of sand either just off shore or on the berm itself, It can be a costly and time-consuming process as it requires upkeep on regular bases. While it may look aesthetically pleasing, it does not fix the problem at hand: the beach has lost its source of natural nourishment. Artificial nourishment is an appropriate short-term solution on small-scale restoration projects.

=== Management ===
Humans are simultaneously increasing the availability of sediment for fluvial transportation through activities and practices that increase soil erosion, and decreasing this flux to the coastal environment through retention of sediment behind reservoir walls and decreasing river discharge rates. The net result is a global reduction in the overall sediment flux. This impact on coastal erosion will be further accelerated as the sea level rises, which is anticipated because of climate change. Given the modern levels of fluvial sediment loads, over 100 billion tons of sediment have been sequestered behind human-made reservoirs. This gives reason for the effects of changes in the upstream fluvial environment to be included into the Integrated coastal zone management framework. Planners and decision makers must consider what the impacts of upstream development will have on the coastal environment. The management of the coastal zone must account for both the effect of human activities as well as the impacts resulting from corresponding changes in the coastal zone.

== See also ==
- Beach erosion and accretion
  - Beach evolution
  - Beach nourishment
  - Modern recession of beaches
  - Raised beach
- Coastal management, to prevent coastal erosion and creation of beach
  - Coastal and oceanic landforms
  - Coastal development hazards
  - Coastal erosion
  - Coastal geography
  - Coastal engineering
    - Hard engineering
    - Soft engineering
  - Coastal morphodynamics
  - Coastal and Estuarine Research Federation (CERF)
  - Human impacts on coasts
  - Sea level rise
  - Natural hazard
- Erosion
  - Bioerosion
  - Blowhole
  - Natural arch
  - Wave-cut platform
- Longshore drift
  - Deposition (sediment)
  - Sand dune stabilization
  - Submersion
