= Integrated coastal zone management =

Environmental management system

Integrated Coastal Zone Management (ICZM), also known as Integrated Coastal Management (ICM) or Integrated Coastal Planning, is a coastal management process that considers geographical and political boundaries and focuses on sustainability. The concept was developed in 1992 during the Earth Summit in Rio de Janeiro and outlined in the proceedings of Agenda 21, Chapter 17.

== Overview ==
=== Framework ===
Integrated Coastal Zone Management (ICZM) is a decision-making framework developed to address region-specific environmental implications for coastal zones by considering interactions between natural, social, and economic systems in coastal areas. ICZM is focused on sustainable coastal development and is relevant for areas of overlapping jurisdictions that require a high level of integration across sectors, stakeholders, and government to implement change.

=== Context ===
==== Management of coastal zones ====
Integrated Coastal Zone Management (ICZM) is focused on sustainable development of coastal zones

Coastal zones are often characterized by diverse ecosystems that provide resources to local human populations. Coastal margins represent 8% of the world's surface area while providing 25% of global resources. Approximately 70% of the world's population lives within a day's walk of the coast, and two-thirds of the world's cities are coastal.

Coastal populations rely on resources like fish and minerals for subsistence, recreation, and economic development. These resources are considered common property and as such may be subject to over harvesting. For example, 90% of the world's fish harvest comes from within national exclusive economic zones, often within sight of the shore. The quantity of extracted resources, along with the process of extraction, compounded by pollution, has impacted local ecosystems.

==== Goals ====
The four documented goals of ICZM are:

1. Maintaining functional integrity of coastal resource systems
2. Reducing resource-use conflicts
3. Maintaining environmental health
4. Facilitating economic development

==== Framework limitations ====
ICZM framework may not be applicable in all situations. For example, the Sumatra earthquake and the Indian Ocean tsunami had significant impacts on the coastal environment itself and has altered perceptions of coastal hazard mitigation.

=== Five-step approach ===
ICZM considers spatial, functional, legal, policy, information, and participation factors of coastal management and targets public participation and stakeholder involvement in order to reduce decision-making conflicts. A balance between environmental protection and economic/social development is considered key to the framework.

1. Situation assessment: Issues are identified and prioritized with input from government, local and regional non-governmental entities, and local residents
2. Plan: A plan specific to the area is developed to address identified issues
3. Institutionalization of plan: Plan is accepted by involved agencies either in the form of legally binding measures or as non-statutory guidance or policy.
4. Implementation: The plan is implemented through law enforcement, education, development, or other mechanisms
5. Evaluation: ICZM is an ongoing process targeted to improving sustainability and as such has no ‘end state'. Once implemented, the framework should be evaluated regularly to assess relative effectiveness.

=== Dimensions of coastal zone management ===
==== Defining coastal zones ====
Defining the coastal zone is of particular importance to the idea of ICZM. Ketchum (1972) defined the area as:

The band of dry land and adjacent ocean space (water and submerged land) in which terrestrial processes and land uses directly affect oceanic processes and uses, and vice versa.

==== Focus on Sustainability ====
The concept behind ICZM is sustainability which entails a continuous decision-making process and readjustment of the equilibrium between development and environmental protection.

Finding integration and synergies

Integrated Coastal Zone Management (ICZM) relies on five principal forms of integration:

1. Integration among sectors: A wide range of sectors operate within the coastal environment, with human activities primarily centered on economic pursuits such as tourism, fisheries, and port operations. Sectoral integration within Integrated Coastal Zone Management (ICZM) relies on identifying shared goals and understanding of each sector's role within the coastal area.
2. Integration between land and water elements of the coastal zone: The coastal zone is shaped by dynamic and interdependent processes, with changes to one system generating cascading effects across others. Spatial integration within Integrated Coastal Zone Management (ICZM) is based on recognition of this interdependence.

The coastal environment is a dynamic relationship between many processes, all of which are interdependent. The link must be made between imposing a change on one system or feature and its inevitable ‘flow on’ effects.

- Integration among levels of government: Between levels of governance, consistency and co-operation is needed throughout planning and policy making. * Integration between nations: This sees ICZM as an important tool on a global scale. If goals and beliefs are common on a supranational scale, large scale problems could be mitigated or avoided.
- Integration among disciplines: Throughout ICZM, knowledge should be accepted from all disciplines. All means of scientific

=== Constraints ===
The term integration in a coastal management context has many horizontal and vertical aspects, and reflects complexity of the task and proves implementation challenge.

==== Top-down and bottom-up approach ====
Major constraints of ICZM are institutional, rather than technological. The top-down approach in administrative decision-making is insufficient as a tool promoting ICZM through the idea of sustainability. Community-based ‘bottom-up’ approaches can perceive issues that are specific to a local arearather than being forced to fit existing strategies or policies. Public consultation and participation incorporate local perspectives into broader policy frameworks and may assist effective implementation.

==== Human factors ====
The coastal environment has historical and cultural connections with human activity. Its wealth of resources have provided for millennia. With regard to ICZM, legally binding management becomes difficult when coastal areas are perceived as common areas available to all. Enforcing restrictions or change to activities within the coastal zone can be difficult as these resources are often very important to people's livelihoods. The idea of the coast being common property fouls ‘top-down ’ approaches. The idea of common property itself is not all that clean, and this perception can lead to cumulative exploitation of resources – the very problem this management seeks to extinguish.

== Adoption ==
=== European Union ===
The European Parliament and the European Council "adopted in 2002 a recommendation on Integrated Coastal Zone Management which defines the principles sound coastal planning and management. These include the need to base planning on sound and shared knowledge, the need to take a long-term and cross-sector perspective, to pro-actively involve stakeholders and the need to take into account both the terrestrial and the marine components of the coastal zone".

=== Iran ===
The General Directorate of Coasts and Ports Engineering within the Ports and Maritime Organizationof Iran was tasked with conducting Integrated Coastal Zone Management (ICZM) studies. The first phase of these studies commenced in spring 2003 and concluded in autumn 2006. The results of this phase were documented in a series of reports.

The second phase of ICZM studies began in autumn 2005 and has since been completed and presented. The second phase was conducted by six Iranian consultants who, with input from international sources, produced eleven reports detailing the findings and outcomes of the study.

=== Mediterranean ===
ICZM Protocol was officially signed at the Conference of Plenipotentiaries on the ICZM Protocol, held on 20–21 January 2008 in Madrid, Spain. Presided over by H.E. Ms. Cristina Narbona Ruiz, the Minister of Environment of Spain, fourteen Contracting Parties to the Barcelona Convention endorsed the Protocol: Algeria, Croatia, France, Greece, Israel, Italy, Malta, Monaco, Montenegro, Morocco, Slovenia, Spain, Syria, and Tunisia. Protocol is consistent with the Mediterranean Action Plan of the United Nations Environment Programme (UNEP/MAP).

ICZM Protocol was signed after a six-year process. Syria became the sixth country to ratify the Protocol on 31 September 2010. In September 2012, Croatia and Morocco ratified the Protocol, bringing the total number of ratifications to nine (Slovenia, Montenegro, Albania, Spain, France, the European Union, Syria, Croatia, and Morocco).

The Action Plan for the implementation of the ICZM Protocol 2012-2019 was adopted on the occasion of the CoP 17, held in Paris from 8 to 10 February 2012.

A roadmap for the implementation of the ICZM Process, prepared by Priority Actions Programme Regional Activity Centre (PAP/RAC), is available on the Coastal Wiki platform of the PEGASO and ENCORA projects: ICZM Process.

On May 8, 2014, the Israeli Government ratified the ICZM Protocol bringing the number of ratifications to 10.

=== New Zealand ===
New Zealand incorporates sustainable management with a focus on coastal environment within its legislation. The Resource Management Act (RMA) (1991) focused on sustainable development in advance of a New Zealand Coastal Policy Statement (NZCPS).

== See also ==
- Beach erosion and accretion
  - Beach evolution
  - Beach nourishment
  - Modern recession of beaches
  - Raised beach
- Coastal management, to prevent coastal erosion and creation of beach
  - Coastal and oceanic landforms
  - Coastal development hazards
  - Coastal erosion
  - Coastal geography
  - Coastal engineering
    - Hard engineering
    - Soft engineering
  - Coastal morphodynamics
  - Coastal and Estuarine Research Federation (CERF)
  - Human impacts on coasts
  - Sea level rise
  - Natural hazard
- Erosion
  - Bioerosion
  - Blowhole
  - Natural arch
  - Wave-cut platform
- Longshore drift
  - Deposition (sediment)
  - Coastal sediment supply
  - Sand dune stabilization
  - Submersion
