= Coastal development hazards =

Type of anthropogenic effect on the environment

A coastal development hazard is something that affects the natural environment by human activities and products. As coasts become more developed, the vulnerability component of the equation increases as there is more value at risk to the hazard. The likelihood component of the equation also increases in terms of there being more value on the coast so a higher chance of hazardous situation occurring. Fundamentally humans create hazards with their presence. In a coastal example, erosion is a process that happens naturally on the Canterbury Bight as a part of the coastal geomorphology of the area and strong long shore currents. This process becomes a hazard when humans interact with that coastal environment by developing it and creating value in that area.

A natural hazard is defined as the release of energy or materials that threaten humans or what they value. In a coastal context these hazards vary temporally and spatially from a rare, sudden, massive release of energy and materials such as a major storm event or tsunami, to the continual chronic release of energy and materials such long-term coastal erosion or sea-level rise. It is this type coastal hazard, specifically around erosion and attributes surrounding erosion that this article will focus on.

== Coastal population growth and development on coasts ==
Globally, the number of people living on the coast is increasing. It has been stated that there has been over a 35% increase in the population of people living on the coasts since 1995. The average density of people in coastal regions is 3 times higher than the global average density. Historically, city development, especially large cities, was based on coasts due to the economic benefits of the ports. In 1950, there were only 2 megacities (cities with greater than 8 million people) in the coastal zone, London and New York City. By the mid-nineties, there were 13. Although coastal areas have globally shown population growth and increases in density, very few in-depth quantitative global studies of population have been carried out, especially in terms of distribution across specific environs, like coasts. The spatial distribution and accuracy of global data must be significantly improved before realistic quantitative assessments of the global impacts of coastal hazards can be made, as currently much of the data is collected and analysed in the aftermath of disasters.

On the heavily developed East Coast of USA, a strong correlation exists between human development, determined by satellite imagery, and reduced rates of erosion, even when studied at regional scales. A combination of the relative permanence of urban infrastructure and coastal defense efforts made to protect such infrastructure is likely the cause of such a relationship. Even after destructive storm events, evidence suggest that US East and Gulf Coast communities tend to rebuild homes and structures that are larger than before the event.

Historical studies have put estimates of the number of deaths due to cyclones over the last 200 years around the Bay of Bengal exceeding 1.3 million. However, in developed countries, as can be expected, the death toll is significantly lower but the economic losses due to coastal hazards are increasing. The US for example had major losses through Hurricane Andrew, which hit Florida and Louisiana in 1992.

This rushing to the coast is exhibited in property value. A study by Bourassa et al. (2004) found that in Auckland, New Zealand, wide sea views contributed on average an additional 59% to the value of a waterfront property. This effect diminished rapidly the further the property was from the coast. In another study, it was found that moving 150 m away from the Gulf of Mexico lowered property values by 36%.

Insurance premiums in coastal hazard areas are an inconsequential determinant of property values, given the significant amenity values provided by the coast in terms of views and local recreation. Sea-level rise, coastal erosion, and the exacerbating interaction between these two natural phenomena are likely to pose a significant threat for the loss of capital assets in coastal areas in the future. It is hard to say if the vulnerability to coastal hazards by those residing there is perceived, yet dominated by the amenity value of coasts, or simply ignored.

== Coastal erosion hazards ==
Coastal erosion is one of the most significant hazards associated with the coast. Not in terms of a rare massive release of energy or material resulting in loss of life, as is associated with tsunami and cyclones, but in terms of a continual chronic release that forms a threat to infrastructure, capital assets and property.

=== Beach erosion process ===
Storm induced large erosion events are a part of the natural evolutionary process of fine sediment, gently sloping beaches. Increased wave energy in storms leads to the removal of foreshore, berm and dune sediments. These displaced sediments are then deposited as near shore sand bars and act to dampen the wave energy lessoning the amount of sediment that is being eroded from the coast. When wave energies decrease post storm events, the sediments from these newly deposited near shore bars are returned to the upper beach, rebuilding the berm. This self-correcting cycle is an active balance between wave energies and fine sediment deposition. This store of sediment being available for erosion in storms and re-depositing when the event has subsided is an important natural buffer mechanism against protecting the mainland from erosion and minimising coastal retreat.

=== Dune destruction ===
Sand dunes are very dynamic fragile structures that act as stores of sediment used to carry out the coastal processes mentioned above. This removal of the upper beach sediments is important from a hazard perspective as this is the area of the coast that is often utilised for property development due to the high prices sea front properties with a view can achieve. In Pegasus Bay, New Zealand, storm events in 1978 and 2001 caused significant erosion of the New Brighton and Waimairi sand beaches. In the 1978 storm event houses on the seaward side of the New Brighton Spit suffered from undercutting as the dune sediment in which they were built on was eroded by high wave energy. This same storm event caused similar erosion damage to houses built on the upper dunes in Raumati Beach, on the west coast of the North Island, New Zealand. Bulldozing and bulk removal of sand from protective coastal dunes is therefore an extremely hazardous activity, and one that has been widely carried out in New Zealand in order to form a surface on which to build on to obtain sea views.

=== Canterbury bight ===
In Kirk (2001) coastal erosion on the Canterbury Bight in New Zealand was said to have reached up to 8 meters per year. This coastal process could be measured in more ways than one, the aforementioned distance of coastal retreat or the decreased dollar value of developed assets, land and infrastructure that are at risk. To date, erosion on the Canterbury Bight has led to the loss of agricultural land, threatened valuable infrastructure including holiday settlements, and reduced coastal lagoons and wetlands.

Historically, erosion on the Canterbury Bight was a natural process, but has now been exacerbated by human intervention. The Waitaki River was the dominant source of sediments for the beaches between Oamaru and Timaru. Since the damming of the Waitaki River in 1935 erosion of the coastal cliffs has become the primary source of sediment in the north flowing current moving up the coast of South Canterbury.

== Erosion mitigation ==
=== Engineered structures ===
This destruction of sand dunes is often then mitigated with construction of seawalls, revetments and groynes in often futile attempts to prevent storm erosion hazards to unsuitably located assets and infrastructure on coasts. These engineered methods are commonly ineffective and frequently actually magnify the hazard or just move the hazard down coast. In Porthcawl, South Wales, a seawall constructed to stop erosion in 1887 was replaced in 1906, 1934 and finally in 1984 when the beach was paved as each prior structure was undermined by further erosion. The loss of aesthetics due to the lack of a sand beach resulted in tourists utilising alternative beaches. Therefore, incurring an even greater economic loss on top of the cost of the engineering.

=== Restorative dune planting ===
The alternative to hard engineering measures is sand dune conservation. This involves protecting the sand dunes and allowing the natural buffering processes to occur. Dune protection and conservation can be facilitated in a number of ways, actively with dune planting and sand fencing, or with better planning by developing away from or well behind the dune structures not on them. On the New Brighton Spit the spread of marram grass (Ammophila arenaria) has resulted in effective dune stabilisation in areas. However this invasive exotic species has mostly replaced indigenous species like pingao (Desmoschoenus spiralis) meaning that although the stability of the coastal area has gained, the historic, native cultural values of the area have suffered.

=== Beach nourishment ===
A further soft-engineering method for protecting the shoreline is beach nourishment. The presence of beach nourishment has been correlated with increases in number of homes and home size along the coast of Florida, US, which ultimately leads to an increase in exposure to coastal hazards.

Due to the cost of beach nourishment, this is a solution that has been used primarily for the benefit of the tourism industry. For example, erosion Miami Beach had almost no stored sediment left by the mid 1970s, consequently, visitor numbers declined and development of the area decreased. A beach nourishment program was set up resulting in an influx of development and infrastructure in the late 1970s. Miami Beach was rejuvenated to such an extent that annual revenue from foreign tourists alone is $2.4 billion, compared to the $52 million cost of the 20-year nourishment project. Tax revenue from tourists who visit Miami Beach alone more than covers the cost of beach nourishment projects across the nation. Using the capitalised annual cost of the project, for every $1 that has been invested annually on the nourishment, Miami Beach has received almost $500 annually in foreign exchange.

== See also ==
- Beach erosion and accretion
  - Beach evolution
  - Beach nourishment
  - Modern recession of beaches
  - Raised beach
- Integrated coastal zone management
  - Coastal management, to prevent coastal erosion and creation of beach
  - Coastal and oceanic landforms
  - Coastal erosion
  - Coastal geography
    - Cuspate foreland
    - Detention basin
  - Coastal engineering
    - Hard engineering
      - Accropode
      - Xbloc
    - Soft engineering
  - Coastal morphodynamics
  - Coastal and Estuarine Research Federation (CERF)
  - Human impacts on coasts
  - Sea level rise
  - Natural hazard
  - List of countries by length of coastline
- Erosion
  - Bioerosion
  - Blowhole
  - Natural arch
  - Wave-cut platform
- Longshore drift
  - Deposition (sediment)
  - Coastal sediment supply
  - Longshore transport
  - Sand dune stabilization
  - Submersion
