= Swash =

Turbulent layer of water that washes ashore after a wave breaks

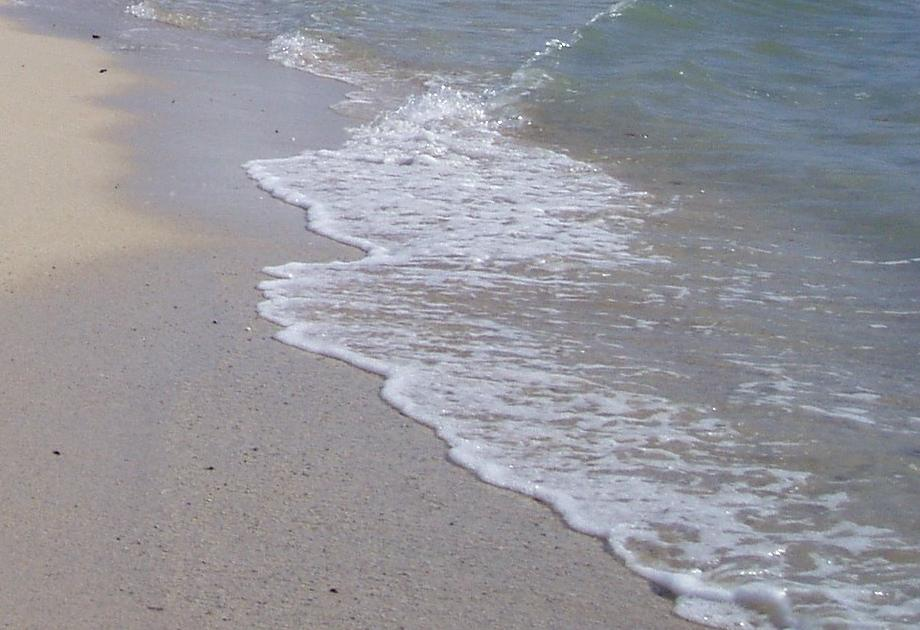
Swash

Swash, or forewash in geography, is a turbulent layer of water that washes up on the beach after an incoming wave has broken. The swash action can move beach materials up and down the beach, which results in cross-shore sediment exchange. The time-scale of swash motion varies from seconds to minutes depending on the type of beach (see Figure 1 for beach types). Greater swash generally occurs on flatter beaches. The swash motion plays the primary role in the formation of morphological features and their changes in the swash zone. The swash action also plays an important role as one of the instantaneous processes in wider coastal morphodynamics.

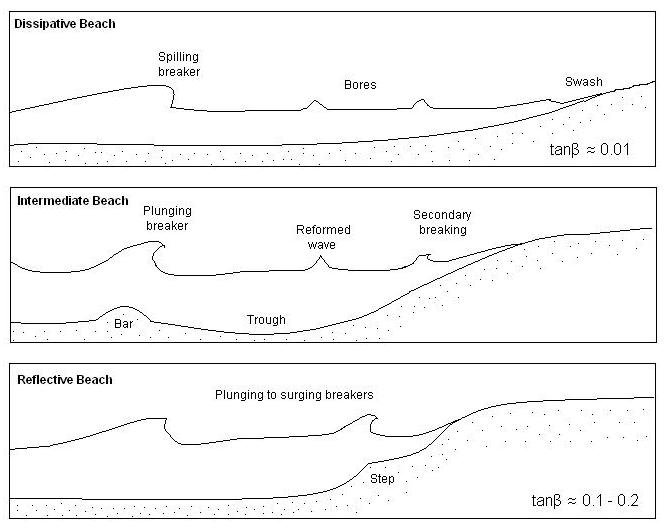
Figure 1. Beach classification by Wright and Short (1983) showing dissipative, intermediate, and reflective beaches.

There are two approaches that describe swash motions: (1) swash resulting from the collapse of high-frequency bores ($f>0.05\,\mathrm{Hz}$) on the beachface; and (2) swash characterised by standing, low-frequency ($f<0.05\,\mathrm{Hz}$) motions. Which type of swash motion prevails is dependent on the wave conditions and the beach morphology and this can be predicted by calculating the surf similarity parameter $\epsilon_{b}$ (Guza & Inman 1975):

$$\epsilon_{b} = \frac{4\pi^{2}H_{b}}{2gT^{2}\tan^{2}{(\beta)}}$$

in which $H_{b}$ is the breaker height, $g$ is gravity, $T$ is the incident-wave period and $\tan{(\beta)}$ is the beach gradient. Values $\epsilon_{b}>20$ indicate dissipative conditions where swash is characterised by standing long-wave motion. Values $\epsilon_{b}<2.5$ indicate reflective conditions where swash is dominated by wave bores.

== Uprush and backwash ==
Swash consists of two phases: uprush (onshore flow) and backwash (offshore flow). Generally, uprush has higher velocity and shorter duration than backwash. Onshore velocities are at greatest at the start of the uprush and then decrease, whereas offshore velocities increase towards the end of the backwash. The direction of the uprush varies with the prevailing wind, whereas the backwash is always perpendicular to the coastline. This asymmetrical motion of swash can cause longshore drift as well as cross-shore sediment transport.

== Swash morphology ==
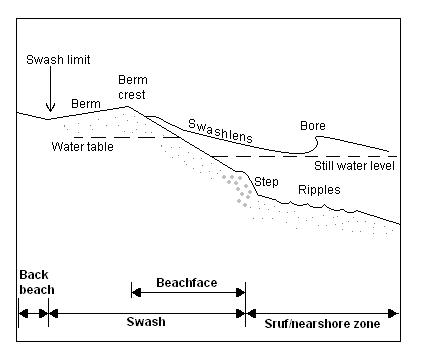
Figure 2. Swash zone and beachface morphology showing terminology and principal processes (Modified from Masselink & Hughes 2003)

The swash zone is the upper part of the beach between backbeach and surf zone, where intense erosion occurs during storms (Figure 2). The swash zone is alternately wet and dry. Infiltration (hydrology) (above the water table) and exfiltration (below the water table) take place between the swash flow and the beach groundwater table. Beachface, berm, beach step and beach cusps are the typical morphological features associated with swash motion. Infiltration (hydrology) and sediment transport by swash motion are important factors that govern the gradient of the beachface.

=== Beachface ===
The beachface is the planar, relatively steep section of the beach profile that is subject to swash processes (Figure 2). The beachface extends from the berm to the low tide level. The beachface is in dynamic equilibrium with swash action when the amount of sediment transport by uprush and backwash are equal. If the beachface is flatter than the equilibrium gradient, more sediment is transported by the uprush to result in net onshore sediment transport. If the beachface is steeper than the equilibrium gradient, the sediment transport is dominated by the backwash and this results in net offshore sediment transport. The equilibrium beachface gradient is governed by a complex interrelationship of factors such as the sediment size, permeability, and fall velocity in the swash zone as well as the wave height and the wave period. The beachface cannot be considered in isolation from the surf zone to understand the morphological changes and equilibriums as they are strongly affected by the surf zone and shoaling wave processes as well as the swash zone processes.

=== Berm ===
The berm is the relatively planar part of the swash zone where the accumulation of sediment occurs at the landward farthest of swash motion (Figure 2). The berm protects the backbeach and coastal dunes from waves but erosion can occur under high energy conditions such as storms. The berm is more easily defined on gravel beaches and there can be multiple berms at different elevations. On sandy beaches in contrast, the gradient of backbeach, berm and beachface can be similar. The height of the berm is governed by the maximum elevation of sediment transport during the uprush. The berm height can be predicted using the equation by Takeda and Sunamura (1982)

$$Z_{\mathrm{berm}}=0.125H_{b}^{5/8}(gT^2)^{3/8}$$

where $H_{b}$ is the breaker height, $g$ is gravity and $T$ is the wave period.

=== Beach step ===
The beach step is a submerged scarp at the base of the beachface (Figure 2). The beach steps generally comprise the coarsest material and the height can vary from several centimetres to over a metre. Beach steps form where the backwash interacts with the oncoming incident wave and generate vortex. Hughes and Cowell (1987) proposed the equation to predict the step height $Z_{\mathrm{step}}$

$$Z_{\mathrm{step}}=\sqrt{H_{b}Tw_{s}},$$

where $w_{s}$ is the sediment fall velocity. Step height increases with increasing wave (breaker) height ($Z_{\mathrm{step}}$), wave period ($T$) and sediment size.

=== Beach cusps ===
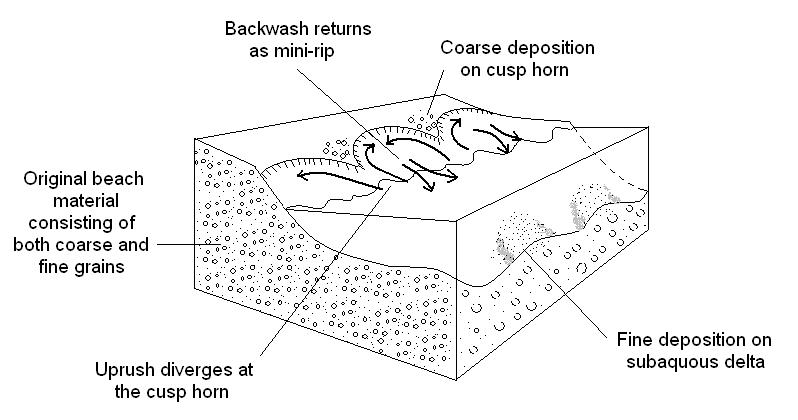
Figure 3. Beach cusp morphology. Uprush diverges at the cusp horns and backwash converges in the cusp embayments. (Modified from Masselink & Hughes 2003)

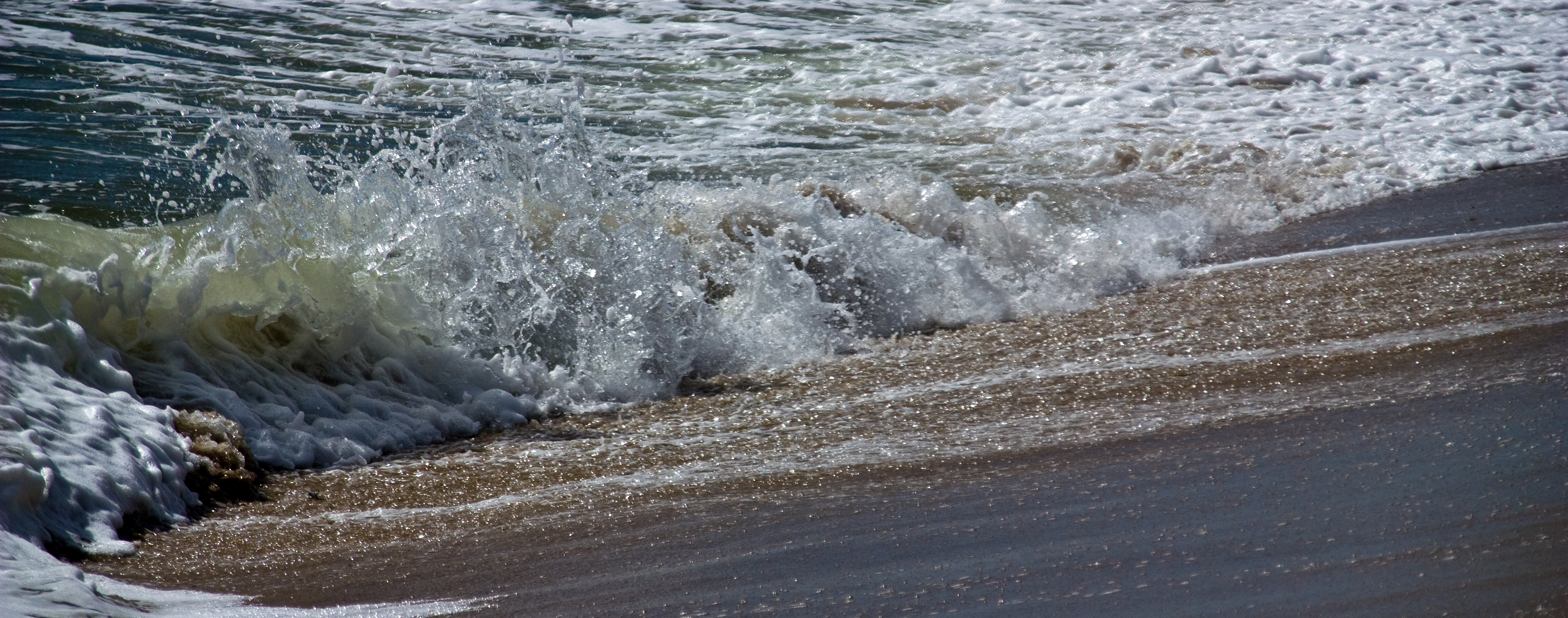
Backwash on a beach

The beach cusp is a crescent-shaped accumulation of sand or gravel surrounding a semicircular depression on a beach. They are formed by swash action and more common on gravel beaches than sand. The spacing of the cusps is related to the horizontal extent of the swash motion and can range from 10 cm to 50 m. Coarser sediments are found on the steep-gradient, seaward pointing ‘cusp horns’ (Figure 3). Currently there are two theories that provide an adequate explanation for the formation of the rhythmic beach cusps: standing edge waves and self-organization.

==== Standing edge wave model ====
The standing edge wave theory, which was introduced by Guza and Inman (1975), suggests that swash is superimposed upon the motion of standing edge waves that travel alongshore. This produces a variation in swash height along the shore and consequently results in regular patterns of erosion. The cusp embayments form at the eroding points and cusp horns occur at the edge wave nodes. The beach cusp spacing can be predicted using the sub-harmonic edge wave model

$$\lambda = \frac{g}{\pi}T^2\tan(\beta),$$

in which $T$ is incident wave period and $\tan{(\beta)}$ is beach gradient.

This model only explains the initial formation of the cusps but not the continuing growth of the cusps. The amplitude of the edge wave reduces as the cusps grow, hence it is a self-limiting process.

==== Self-organization model ====
The self-organization theory was introduced by Werner and Fink (1993) and it suggests that beach cusps form due to a combination of positive feedback that is operated by beach morphology and swash motion encouraging the topographic irregularity and negative feedback that discourages accretion or erosion on well-developed beach cusps. It is relatively recent that the computational resources and sediment transport formulations became available to show that the stable and rhythmic morphological features can be produced by such feedback systems. The beach cusp spacing, based on the self-organization model, is proportional to the horizontal extent of the swash motion S using the equation

$$\lambda = fS,$$

where the constant of proportionality f is c. 1.5.

== Sediment transport ==
=== Cross-shore sediment transport ===
The cross-shore sediment exchange, between the subaerial and sub-aqueous zones of the beach, is primarily provided by the swash motion. The transport rates in the swash zone are much higher compared to the surf zone and suspended sediment concentrations can exceed 100 kg/m^{3} close to the bed. The onshore and offshore sediment transport by swash thus plays a significant role in accretion and erosion of the beach.

There are fundamental differences in sediment transport between the uprush and backwash of the swash flow. The uprush, which is mainly dominated by bore turbulence, especially on steep beaches, generally suspends sediments to transport. Flow velocities, suspended sediment concentrations and suspended fluxes are greatest at the start of the uprush when the turbulence is maximum. Then the turbulence dissipates towards the end of the onshore flow, settling the suspended sediment to the bed. In contrast, the backwash is dominated by the sheet flow and bedload sediment transport. The flow velocity increases towards the end of the backwash causing more bed-generated turbulence, which results in sediment transport near the bed. The direction of the net sediment transport (onshore or offshore) is largely governed by the beachface gradient.

=== Longshore drift ===
Longshore drift by swash occurs either due to beach cusp morphology or due to oblique incoming waves causing strong alongshore swash motion. Under the influence of longshore drift, when there is no slack-water phase during backwash flows, sediments can remain suspended to result in offshore sediment transport. Beachface erosion by swash processes is not very common but erosion can occur where swash has a significant alongshore component.

== Management ==
The swash zone is highly dynamic, accessible and susceptible to human activities. This zone can be very close to developed properties. It is said that at least 100 million people on the globe live within one meter of mean sea level. Understanding the swash zone processes and wise management is vital for coastal communities which can be affected by coastal hazards, such as erosion and storm surge. The swash zone processes cannot be considered in isolation as it is strongly linked with the surf zone processes. Many other factors, including human activities and climate change, can also influence the morphodynamics in the swash zone. Understanding the wider morphodynamics is essential in successful coastal management.

Construction of sea walls has been a common tool to protect developed property, such as roads and buildings, from coastal erosion and recession. However, more often than not, protecting the property by building a seawall does not achieve the retention of the beach. Building an impermeable structure such as a seawall within the swash zone can interfere with the morphodynamics system in the swash zone. Building a seawall can raise the water table, increase wave reflection and intensify turbulence against the wall. This ultimately results in erosion of the adjacent beach or failure of the structure. Boulder ramparts (also known as revetments or riprap) and tetrapods are less reflective than impermeable sea walls, as waves are expected to break across the materials to produce swash and backwash that do not cause erosion. Rocky debris is sometimes placed in front of a sea wall in the attempt to reduce the wave impact, as well as to allow the eroded beach to recover.

Understanding the sediment transport system in the swash zone is also vital for beach nourishment projects. Swash plays a significant role in transportation and distribution of the sand that is added to the beach. There have been failures in the past due to inadequate understanding. Understanding and prediction of the sediment movements, both in the swash and surf zone, is vital for the nourishment project to succeed.

=== Example ===
The coastal management at Black Rock, on the north-east coast of Phillip Bay, Australia, provides a good example of a structural response to beach erosion which resulted in morphological changes in the swash zone. In the 1930s, a sea wall was built to protect the cliff from recession at Black Rock. This resulted in depletion of the beach in front of the sea wall, which was damaged by repeated storms in winter time. In 1969, the beach was nourished with approximately 5000m^{3} of sand from inland in order to increase the volume of sand on the beach to protect the sea wall. This increased the sand volume by about 10%, however, the sand was carried away by northward drifting in autumn to leave the sea wall exposed to the impacts of winter storms again. The project had failed to take the seasonal patterns of longshore drift into account and had underestimated the amount of sand to nourish with, especially on the southern part of the beach.

== Research ==
It is said that conduct of morphology research and field measurements in the swash zone is challenging since it is a shallow and aerated environment with rapid and unsteady swash flows. Despite the accessibility to the swash zone and the capability to take measurements with high resolution compared to the other parts of the nearshore zone, irregularity of the data has been an impediment for analysis as well as critical comparisons between theory and observation. Various and unique methods have been used for field measurements in the swash zone. For wave run-up measurements, for example, Guza and Thornton (1981, 1982) used an 80m long dual-resistance wire stretched across the beach profile and held about 3 cm above the sand by non-conducting supports. Holman and Sallenger (1985) conducted run-up investigation by taking videos of the swash to digitise the positions of the waterline over time. Many of the studies involved engineering structures, including seawalls, jetties and breakwaters, to establish design criteria that protect the structures from overtopping by extreme run-ups. Since the 1990s, swash hydrodynamics have been more actively investigated by coastal researchers, such as Hughes M.G., Masselink J. and Puleo J.A., contributing to the better understanding of the morphodynamics in the swash zone including turbulence, flow velocities, interaction with the beach groundwater table, and sediment transport. However, the gaps in understanding still remain in swash research including turbulence, sheet flow, bedload sediment transport and hydrodynamics on ultra-dissipative beaches.

== See also ==
- Beach cusp
- Beach nourishment
- Coastal management
- Longshore drift
- Sea wall
- Sediment transport
