= Sand engine =

Method for coastal protection

Coordinates: 52.0519°N 4.1836°E

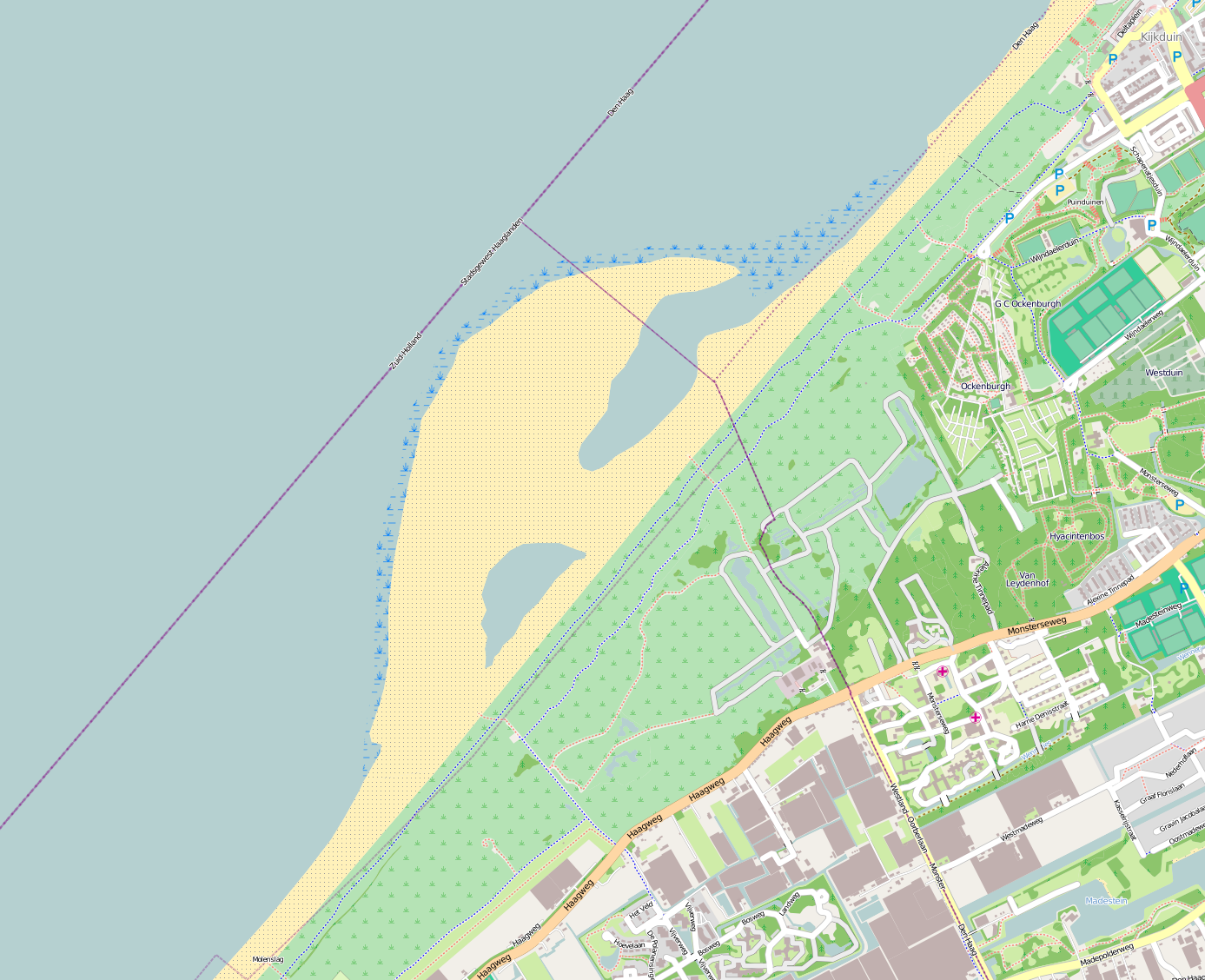
Map of the sand engine in 2012 on OpenStreetMap

The sand engine or sand motor (Dutch: zandmotor) is a type of beach nourishment where a large volume of sediment is added to a coast. The natural forces of wind, waves and tides then distribute the sand along the coast over many years, preventing the need for repetitive beach nourishment. The method is expected to be more cost effective and also reduces the repeated ecological disturbances caused by replenishment.

The first sand engine was constructed off South Holland in the Netherlands. A 128 ha hook-shaped peninsula was created between Ter Heijde and Kijkduin in 2011 at the request of the Hoogheemraadschap van Delfland.

== Building with nature ==
The sand engine differs significantly from previous beach nourishment strategies. Traditionally, shoreface nourishments consist of 1-2 million m^{3} of sand and these projects usually only last for 3-5 years before they need repeating. For the first sand engine, an order of magnitude more sand was used and it is expected to last many times longer. By depositing large amounts of sand in one go, the process can be carried out only every 10-20 years as opposed to 3-5-year cycles of traditional nourishments. This reduces disturbances to the seabed. Even though the initial local perturbation is quite large, the Dutch example shows that ecological stress is limited to the location of the nourishment and, over time, it stimulates the emergence of a large variety of animal and plant species. The available space for ecosystems also increases over time.

Professor Marcel Stive is considered the inventor of the sand engine.

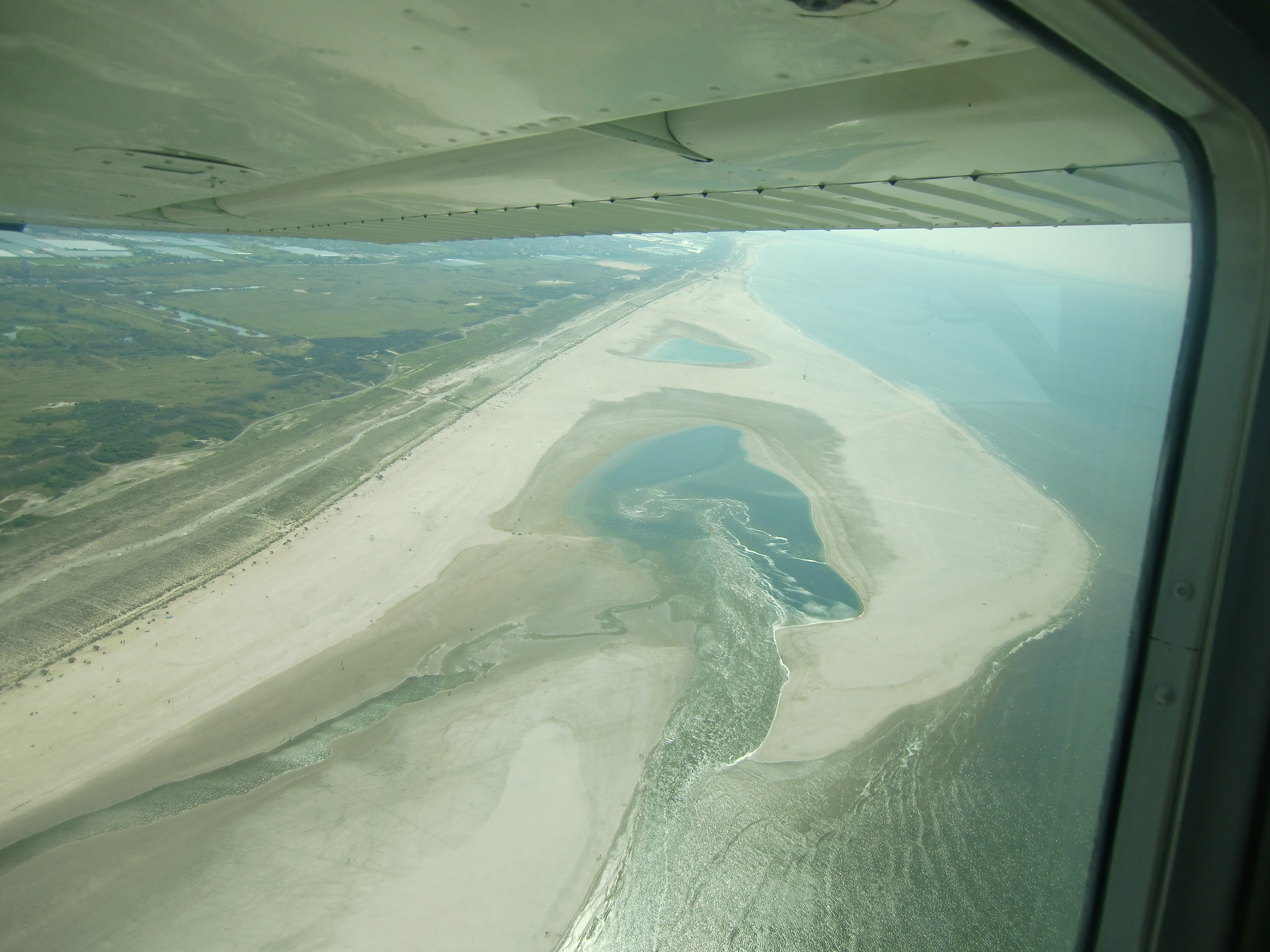
Aerial photo of the sand engine

== Original Sand Engine ==
The first sand engine of its kind was constructed at Ter Heijde in the Netherlands, costing 70 million euros, and was named DeltaDuin in Dutch. Work began in January 2011 and conditions were favourable so the operation was completed in October 2011. Joop Atsma, State Secretary for Infrastructure and Environment, presented the project in November 2011 and his purpose was to convince that the technique could be useful on more locations along the Dutch coast.

A volume of 21.5 million m^{3} of sand, dredged from 5-10 km offshore, covered an area of 128 ha, spanning 2.4 km along the coastline and extending up to 1 km offshore. The sand was deposited in the form of a hook-shaped peninsula. Wind, wave and tide action were allowed to distribute the sand further. The project was designed to have a lifespan of up to 20 years, however in 2016 it was concluded that it would last even longer than expected. Model projections indicate that approximately 200 ha of beach area will be gained.

Bringing underwater sand to the surface has enabled beachcombers to find artifacts and remains of the prehistoric inhabitants of now-submerged Doggerland. Their original context however is lost.

A similar project could provide a solution between Camperduin and Petten, which is called the Hondsbossche seawall.

== Bacton Gas Terminal ==
In 2019 a sand engine was constructed to protect the Bacton Gas Terminal and surrounding area in Norfolk, United Kingdom, shifting two million cubic metres of sand.
