= Pocket beach =

Small beach between two headlands

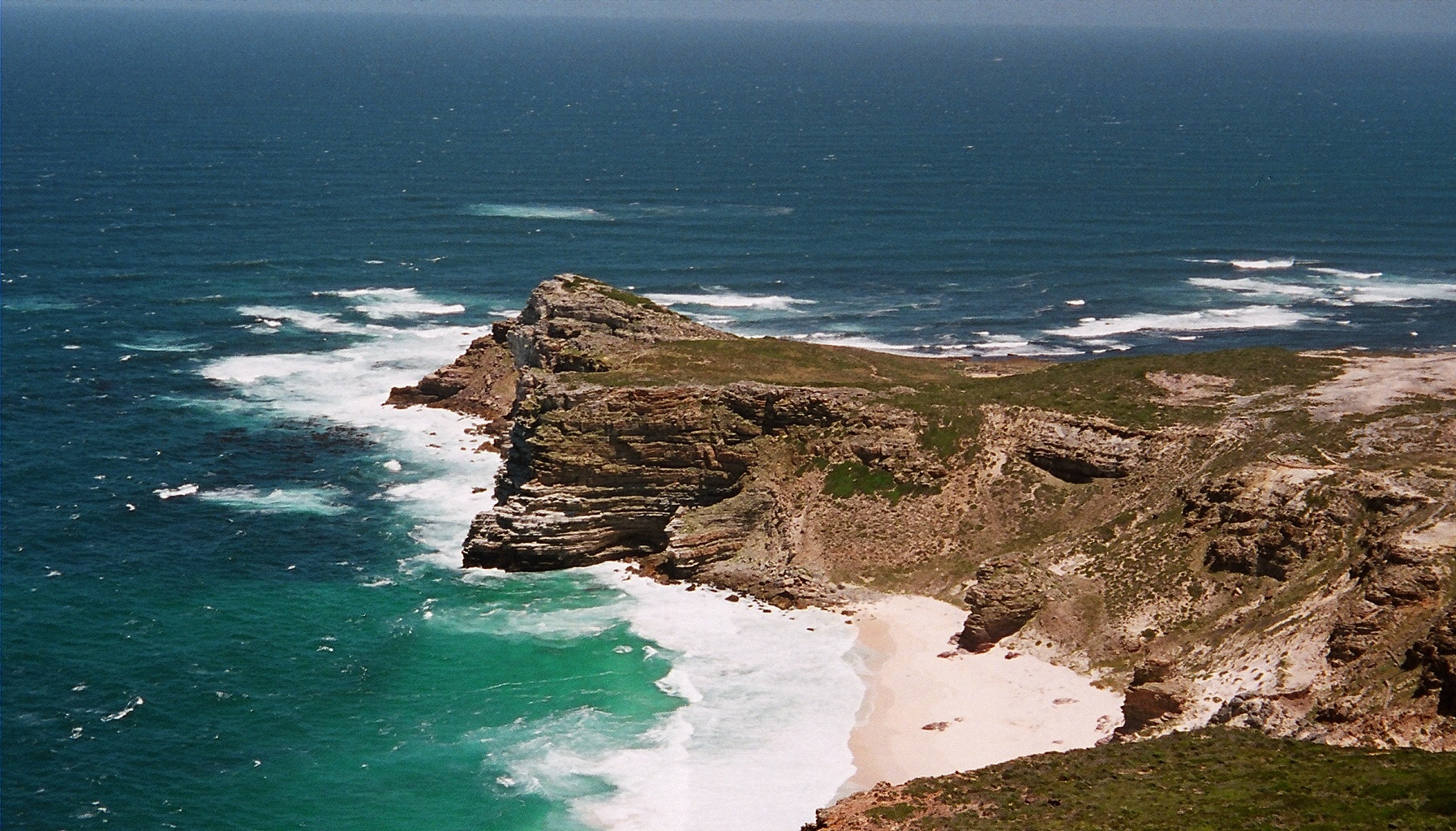
Pocket beach at the Cape of Good Hope

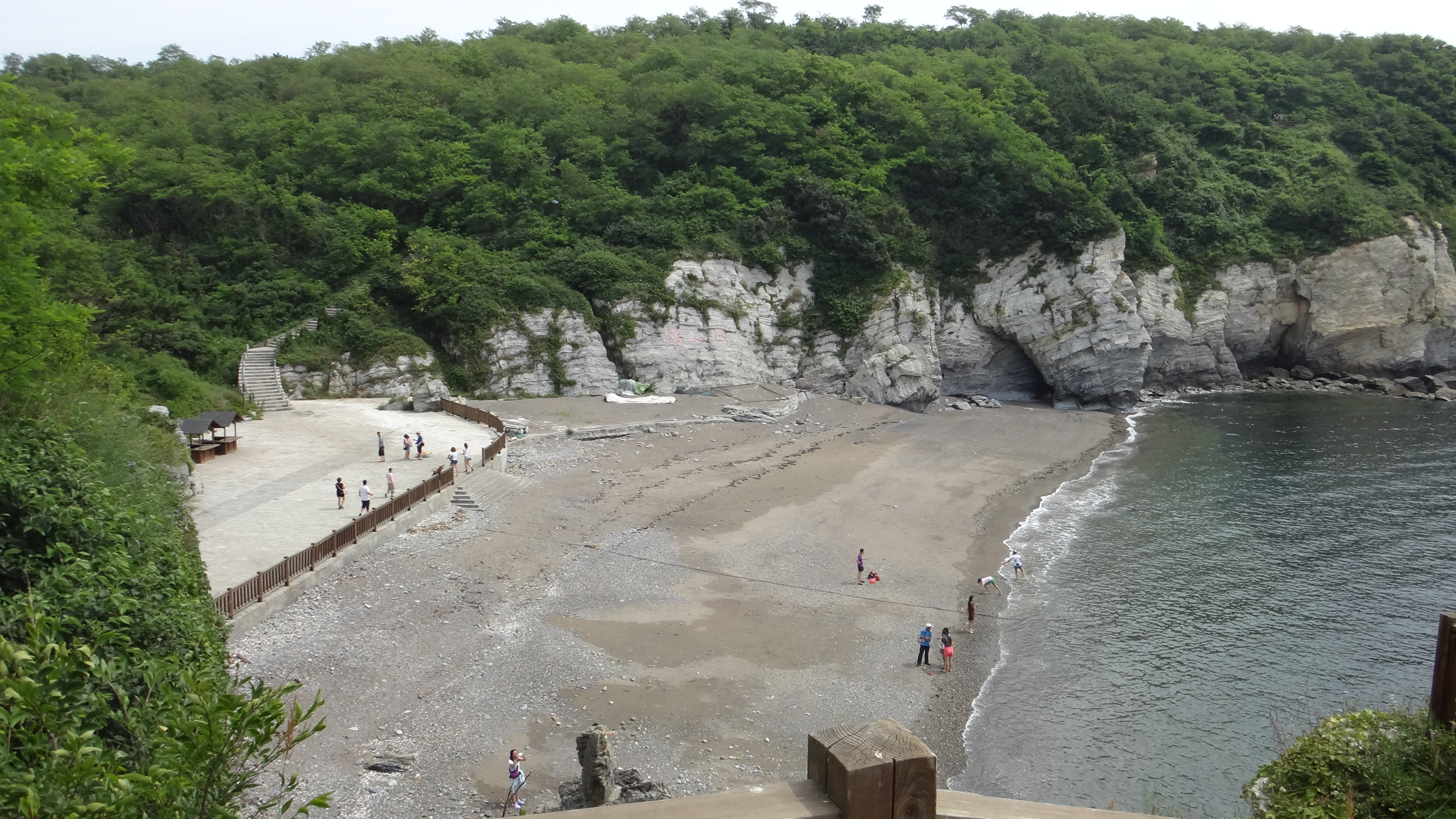
Pocket beach at Jinshitan Coastal National Geopark, Dalian, China

A pocket beach is usually a small beach that is isolated between two headlands. There is typically very little or no exchange of sediment between the pocket beach and adjacent shorelines.

Pocket beaches can be natural or artificial. Many natural pocket beaches exist throughout the world. Artificial pocket beaches are usually constructed in areas where natural beaches are fairly narrow or absent. Examples of artificial pocket beaches include over 100 such systems on the Chesapeake Bay in the United States, each consisting of several individual pocket beaches; the Fisher Key, Florida project constructed on a dredge spoil island originally consisting of cobble dredge material; and the Fred Howard Park Beach that was constructed offshore of a muddy mangrove shoreline. Additionally, there have been many pocket beaches constructed in the Caribbean where resorts have been developed along rocky shorelines with minimal natural beaches.

== Sources ==
- NOAA -- Beach Nourishment with Emphasis on Geological Characteristics Affecting Project Performance
