= Coastal morphodynamics =

Interaction of shoreline seafloor topography and fluid hydrodynamic processes

Coastal morphodynamics is the study of interactions between coastal landforms and physical processes, such as waves, tides, currents, wind, sediment transport, and severe weather events. Shoreline evolution occurs over short- and long-term timescales through gradual and episodic changes influenced by interconnected factors, including hydrodynamic forcing, environmental conditions, and local geology. The field uses observations, practical and computer models to analyze the coastal environment and anticipate dynamic changes. Conclusions from coastal morphodynamics provide insight into the factors that shape coastlines and the effects of anthropogenic activity on coastal systems.

While hydrodynamic processes respond instantaneously to morphological change, morphological change requires the redistribution of sediment. As sediment takes a finite time to move, there is a lag in the morphological response to hydrodynamic forcing, making it a time-dependent coupling mechanism. Since the boundary conditions of hydrodynamic forcing change regularly, the affected beach never attains equilibrium. Morphodynamic processes exhibit positive and negative feedbacks (such that beaches can, over different timescales, be considered both self-forcing and self-organized systems), nonlinearities and threshold behavior.

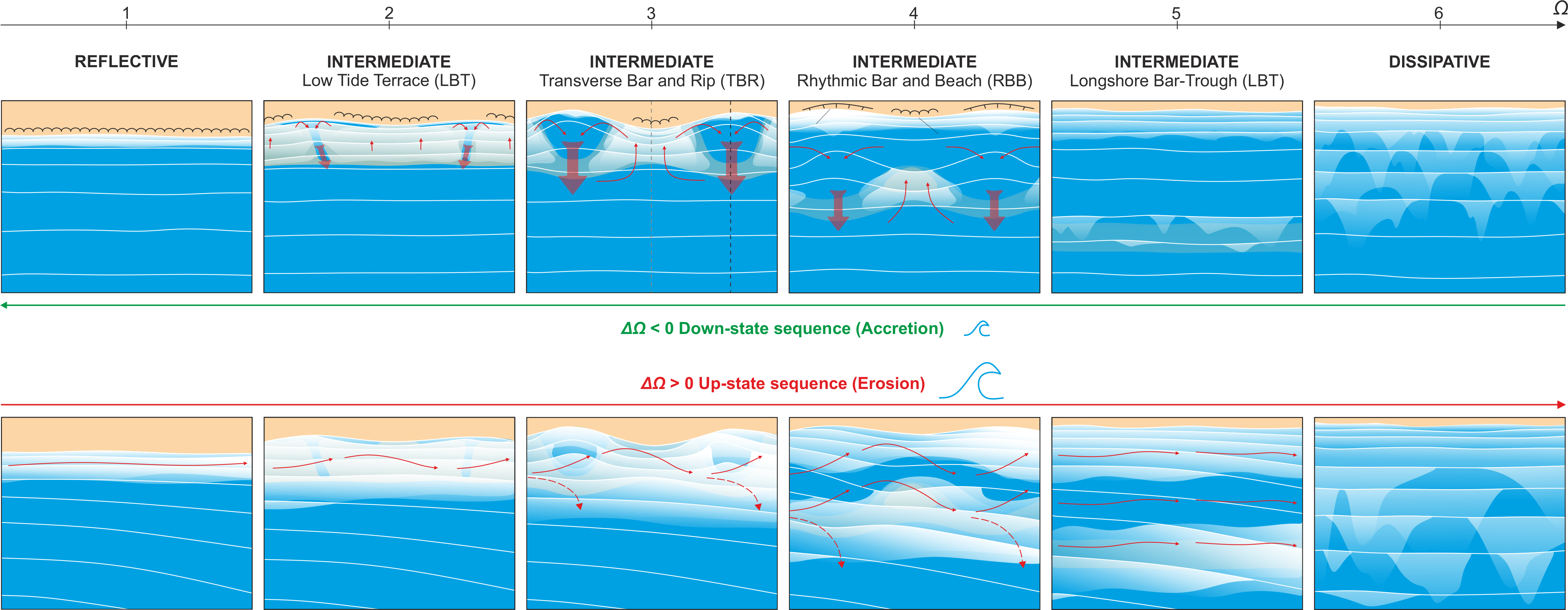
Schematic representation of different coastal morphodynamic phenomena based on Wright and Thom's work

== Origins of coastal morphodynamics ==
Early investigations of coastal morphodynamics were published by Lynn D. Wright and Bruce G. Thom in 1977. This work helped to formalize the study of coastal landform change. Field observations of coastal landforms, such as sand dunes and estuaries, were conducted to document sediment transport and shoreline morphology. This led to the development of a basic conceptual model that links the interconnected factors influencing coastal evolution. Their work emphasized the interaction between geomorphology and hydrodynamic processes to predict the effects of dynamic change.

== Beach types ==
=== Dissipative beaches ===
Dissipative beaches are flat, have fine sand, incorporating waves that tend to break far from the intertidal zone and dissipate force progressively along wide surf zones. Dissipative beaches are wide and flat in profile, with a wide shoaling and surf zone, composed of finer sediment, and characterized by spilling breakers.

=== Reflective beaches ===
Reflective beaches are steep, and are known for their coarse sand; they have no surf zone, and the waves break brusquely on the intertidal zone. Reflective beaches are typically steep in profile with a narrow shoaling and surf zone, composed of coarse sediment, and characterized by surging breakers. Coarser sediment allows percolation during the swash part of the wave cycle, thus reducing the strength of backwash and allowing material to be deposited in the swash zone.

== Morphodynamic processes ==
Transitions between beach states are often caused by changes in wave energy, with storms causing reflective beach profiles to flatten (offshore movement of sediment under steeper waves), thus adopting a more dissipative profile. Morphodynamic processes are also associated with other coastal landforms, for example spur and groove formation topography on coral reefs and tidal flats in infilling estuaries.

Depending on beach state, near bottom currents show variations in the relative dominance of motions due to: incident waves, subharmonic oscillations, infragravity oscillations, and mean longshore and rip currents. On reflective beaches, incident waves and subharmonic edge waves are dominant. In highly dissipative surf zones, shoreward decay of incident waves is accompanied by shoreward growth of infragravity energy; in the inner surf zone, currents associated with infragravity standing waves dominate. On intermediate states with pronounced bar-trough (straight or crescentic) topographies, incident wave orbital velocities are generally dominant but significant roles are also played by subharmonic and infragravity standing waves, longshore currents, and rips. The strongest rips and associated feeder currents occur in association with intermediate transverse bar and rip topographies.

== See also ==
- Beach nourishment
