= Accretion (coastal management) =

Process of coastal sediment returning to the visible portion of a beach

Accretion is the process of coastal sediment returning to the visible portion of a beach or foreshore after a submersion event. A sustainable beach or foreshore often goes through a cycle of submersion during rough weather and later accretion during calmer periods.

If a coastline is not in a healthy sustainable state, erosion can be more serious, and accretion does not fully restore the original volume of the visible beach or foreshore, which leads to permanent beach loss.
