= Submersion (coastal management) =

Aspect of coastal erosion

Submersion is the sustainable cyclic portion of coastal erosion where coastal sediments move from the visible portion of a beach to the submerged nearshore region, and later return to the original visible portion of the beach. The recovery portion of the sustainable cycle of sediment behaviour is named accretion.

== Submersion vs erosion ==
The sediment that is submerged during rough weather forms landforms including storm bars. In calmer weather waves return sediment to the visible part of the beach. Due to longshore drift some sediment can end up further along the beach from where it started. Often coastal areas have developed sustainable coastal positions where the sediment moving off beaches is sustainable submersion. On many inhabited coastlines, anthropogenic interference in coastal processes has meant that erosion is often more permanent than submersion.

== Community perception ==
The term erosion often is associated with undesirable impacts on the environment, whereas submersion is a sustainable part of healthy foreshores. Communities making decisions about coastal management need to develop understanding of the components of beach recession and be able to separate the component that is temporary sustainable submersion from the more serious irreversible anthropogenic or climate change erosion portion.
