= Landform =

Feature of the solid surface of a planetary body

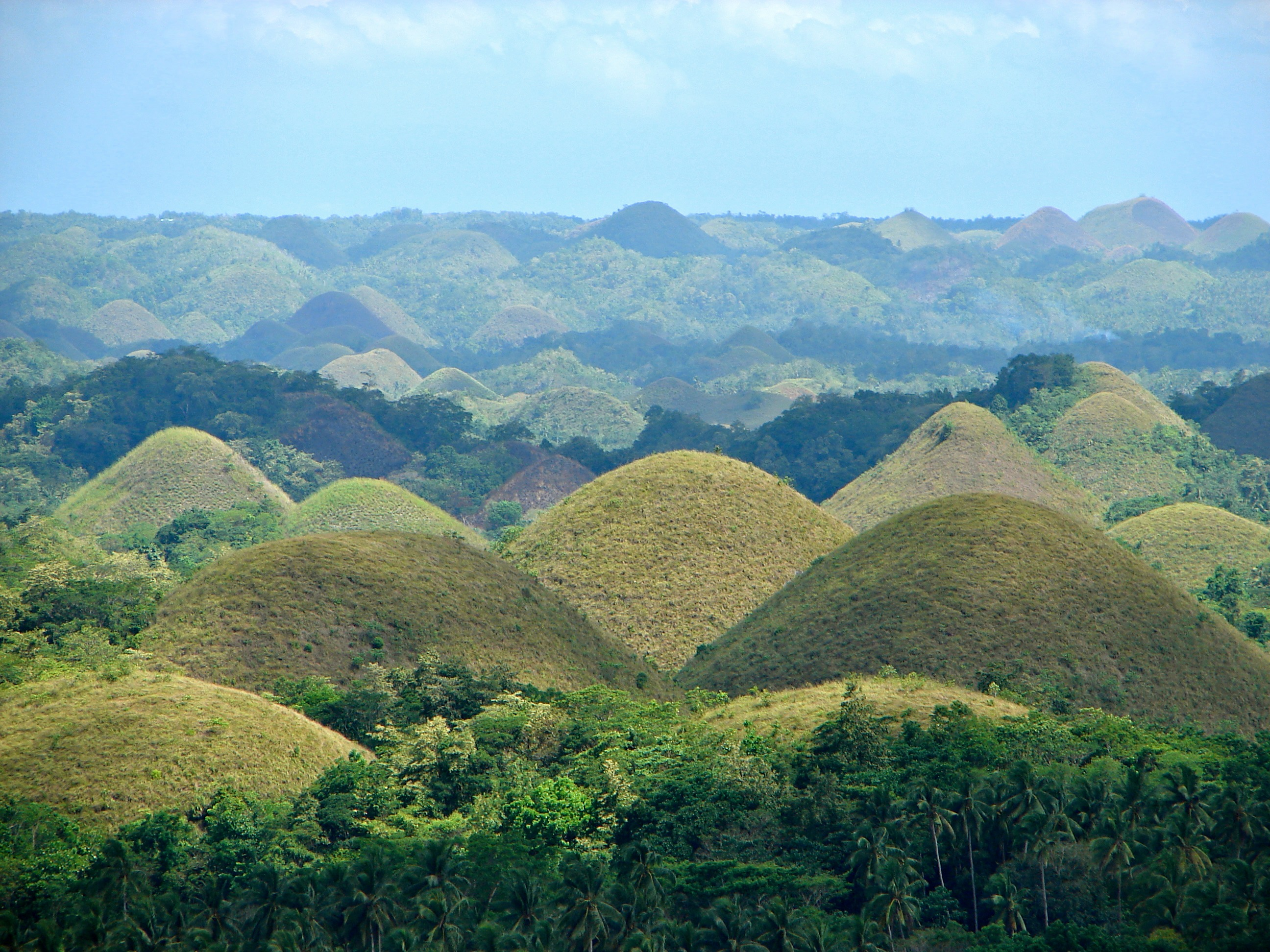
The Chocolate Hills constitute a landform.

A landform is a land feature on the solid surface of the Earth or other planetary body. They may be natural or may be anthropogenic (caused or influenced by human activity). Landforms together make up a given terrain, and their arrangement in the landscape is known as topography. Landforms include hills, mountains, canyons, and valleys, as well as shoreline features such as bays, peninsulas, and seas, including submerged features such as mid-ocean ridges, volcanoes, and the great oceanic basins.

== Physical characteristics ==
Landforms are categorized by characteristic physical attributes such as elevation, slope, orientation, and structure stratification, rock exposure, and soil type. Gross physical features or landforms include intuitive elements such as berms, cliffs, hills, mounds, peninsulas, ridges, rivers, valleys, volcanoes, and numerous other structural and size-scaled (e.g. ponds vs. lakes, hills vs. mountains) elements including various kinds of inland and oceanic waterbodies and sub-surface features. Hills, mountains, plains, and plateaus are the four major types of landforms on Earth. Minor landforms include basins, buttes, canyons, and valleys. The tectonic plate movements under Earth's crust can create landforms by pushing up hills and mountains.

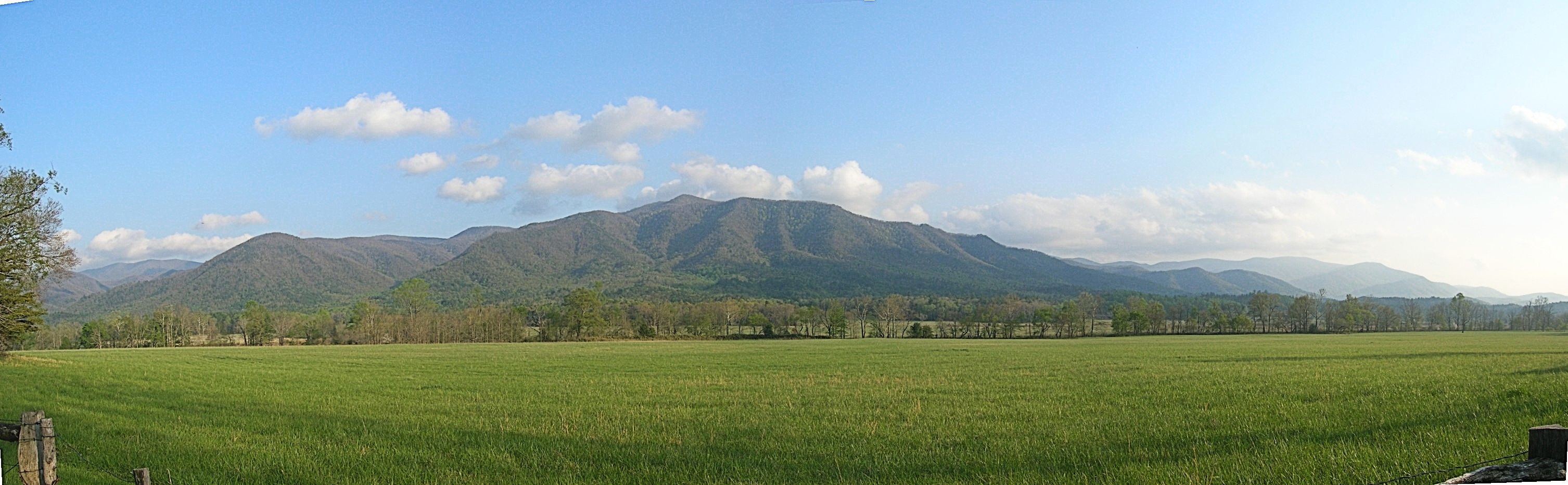
Panorama of Great Smoky Mountains National Park showing physical features of a rolling plain, actually part of a broad valley, distant foothills, and a backdrop of the old, much weathered Appalachian mountain range

== Hierarchy of classes ==
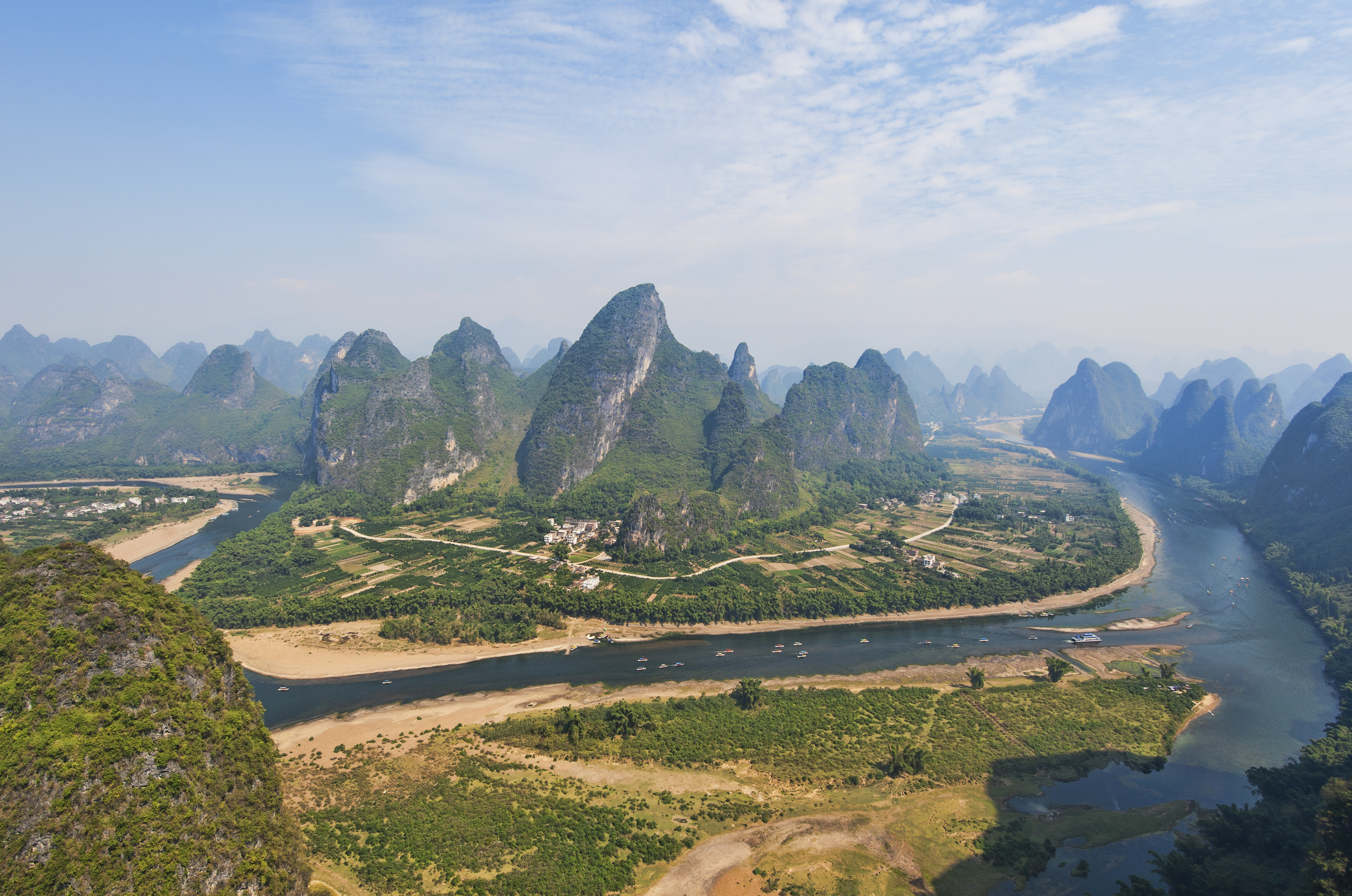
Karst tower landforms along the Lijiang River, Guilin, China

Landforms by order
Order	Landforms
First	Continents and oceans
Second	Hills, mountains, plains, and plateaus
Third	Lakes, mountain peaks, sand dunes, valleys, and waterfalls etc.

Continents and oceans exemplify the highest-order landforms. Landform elements are parts of a high-order landforms that can be further identified and systematically given a cohesive definition such as hill-tops, shoulders, saddles, foreslopes and backslopes.

Some generic landform elements including: pits, peaks, channels, ridges, passes, pools and plains.

Terrain (or relief) is the third or vertical dimension of land surface. Topography is the study of terrain, although the word is often used as a synonym for relief itself. When relief is described underwater, the term bathymetry is used. In cartography, many different techniques are used to describe relief, including contour lines and triangulated irregular networks.

Elementary landforms (segments, facets, relief units) are the smallest homogeneous divisions of the land surface, at the given scale/resolution. These are areas with relatively homogeneous morphometric properties, bounded by lines of discontinuity. A plateau or a hill can be observed at various scales, ranging from a few hundred meters to hundreds of kilometers. Hence, the spatial distribution of landforms is often scale-dependent, as is the case for soils and geological strata.

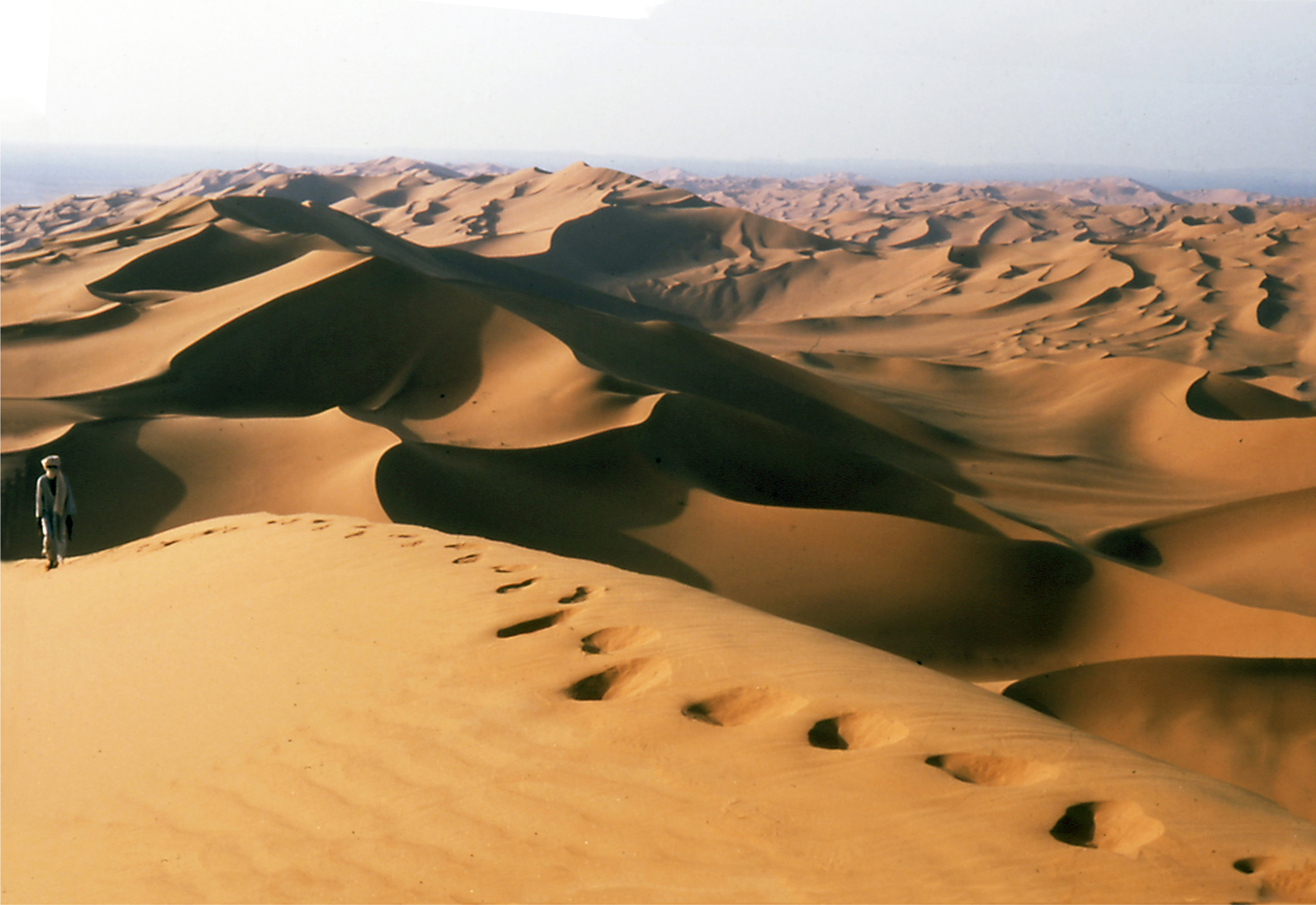
Erg Tiffernine in Algerian Sahara

A number of factors, ranging from plate tectonics to erosion and deposition (also due to human activity), can generate and affect landforms. Biological factors can also influence landforms—for example, note the role of vegetation in the development of dune systems and salt marshes, and the work of corals and algae in the formation of coral reefs.

Landforms do not include several man-made features, such as canals, ports and many harbors; and geographic features, such as deserts, forests, and grasslands. Many of the terms are not restricted to refer to features of the planet Earth, and can be used to describe surface features of other planets and similar objects in the Universe. Examples are mountains, hills, polar caps, and valleys, which are found on all of the terrestrial planets.

The scientific study of landforms is known as geomorphology.

In onomastic terminology, toponyms (geographical proper names) of individual landform objects (mountains, hills, valleys, etc.) are called oronyms.

== Recent developments ==
Landforms may be extracted from a digital elevation model (DEM) using some automated techniques where the data has been gathered by modern satellites and stereoscopic aerial surveillance cameras. Until recently, compiling the data found in such data sets required time consuming and expensive techniques involving many man-hours. The most detailed DEMs available are measured directly using LIDAR techniques.

== See also ==
- Geomorphology – Scientific study of landforms
  - Glossary of landforms
  - Terrain – Dimension and shape of land surfaces
  - Geomorphologist – Person who studies landforms
  - Geomorphosite – Landform of scientific or social value
- Beach erosion and accretion – Area of loose particles at the edge of a body of water
  - Beach evolution – Changes to a shoreline by accretion and erosion
  - Beach nourishment – Sediment replacement process
  - Modern recession of beaches – Loss of sand and beach dimensions resulting from coastal erosion
  - Raised beach – Emergent coastal landform
  - Strand plain – Belt of sand along a shoreline
- Coastal management – Preventing flooding and erosion of shorelines, to prevent coastal erosion and creation of beach
  - Coastal and oceanic landforms – Feature of the solid surface of a planetary body
  - Coastal development hazards – Type of anthropogenic effect on the environment
  - Coastal erosion – Displacement of land along the coastline
  - Coastal geography – Study of the region between the ocean and the land
  - Coastal engineering – Branch of civil engineering
  - Coastal morphodynamics – Interaction of shoreline seafloor topography and fluid hydrodynamic processes
  - Coastal and Estuarine Research Federation – U.S. nonprofit organization (CERF)
- Erosion – Natural processes removing soil and rock
  - Bioerosion – Erosion of hard ocean substrates by living organisms
  - Blowhole – Hole at the top of a sea-cave which allows waves to force water or spray out of the hole
  - Natural arch – Arch-shaped natural rock formation
  - Wave-cut platform – Narrow flat area created by erosion
- Longshore drift – Sediment moved by the longshore current
  - Deposition (sediment) – Geological process in which sediments are added to a landform or landmass
  - Coastal sediment supply – Transport of sediment to the beach environment
  - Sand dune stabilization – Coastal management practice
  - Submersion – Aspect of coastal erosion

== Sources ==
- Room, Adrian (1996). An Alphabetical Guide to the Language of Name Studies. Lanham and London: The Scarecrow Press. ISBN 9780810831698.
