= Recession (disambiguation) =

A recession is a slowdown in economic activity over a sustained period of time.

Recession may also refer to:

- Modern recession of beaches, a loss in sand and beach dimensions resulting from coastal erosion
- Ceremonial recession, the return journey of a group involved in a ceremonial procession
- Receding gums, a loss of gum tissue resulting in the roots of teeth becoming exposed
- Recession of a satellite moving to a higher orbit, as in the case of tidal acceleration.
- Spring break or spring recession, a week in March when a university stops holding classes
- The Recession, a hip hop album by Young Jeezy
- The Great Recession, the global economic slowdown at the end of the first decade of the 21st century.
