= Honeycomb sea wall =

Coastal defense structure

A honeycomb sea wall (also known as a "Seabee") is a coastal defense structure that protects against strong waves and tides. It is constructed as a sloped wall of ceramic or concrete blocks with hexagonal holes on the slope, which makes it look like a honeycomb, hence the name of the unit. Its role is to capture sand and to discharge wave energy.

Ceramic honeycomb sea wall units usually have 6 or 7 holes and are safer to walk on. These are placed as a revetment over gravel or rock. During strong storms, surging sea water loses energy as it travels down the holes and through the underlayer. The water returns to the sea by upward flow through holes at levels below the transient phreatic surface in the underlayer, causing the downslope disturbing drag force to be reduced. Water that does not go through the holes is redirected by the concrete wall back into the path of oncoming waves, creating more turbulence. Cost comparisons between various seawalls are always site specific, but Seabees use approximately 22% the mass of rock for the same exposure. As the area of the unit is sensibly independent of height [aspect ratios in use vary from 0.4 to 2.5] the mass of the unit can be optimised for all stages of the production and construction process. Surface roughness may also be determined by using combinations of different height units. Allowance for wear is easily allowed [e.g. Shoreham, 1989-90 & various Lincolnshire Seawalls]. Reductions of almost 50% in runup have been achieved, both in the laboratory and at chosen sites.

== See also ==
- Beach
- Coastal management, for creation and maintenance of beach
- Coastal erosion
- Longshore drift
- Coastal geography
- Strand plain
- Sand dune stabilization
