= Beach evolution =

Changes to a shoreline by accretion and erosion

Beach evolution is a natural process occurring along shorelines where sea, lake, or river water erodes the land. Beaches form as sand accumulates over centuries through recurrent processes that erode rocky and sedimentary material into sand deposits. River deltas contribute by depositing silt carried from upriver, accreting at the river's outlet to extend lake or ocean shorelines. Catastrophic events such as tsunamis, hurricanes, and storm surges accelerate beach evolution.

== Accretion and erosion ==
=== Sudden and rapid processes ===
==== Tsunamis and hurricane-driven storm surges ====

Tsunamis can cause significant erosion and sediment displacement. They can strip away years of accumulated sand from beaches and devastate coastal vegetation. These powerful waves can flood inland areas far beyond the typical high-tide mark. Additionally, the swift currents associated with the inundating tsunami can demolish homes and other coastal structures.

A storm surge is an onshore gush of water associated with a low pressure weather system. Storm surges can cause beach accretion and erosion. Historically notable storm surges occurred during the North Sea Flood of 1953, Hurricane Katrina, and the 1970 Bhola cyclone.

==== Volcanism and earthquakes related sea-level changes ====
Both geological events and the climate can change (progressively or suddenly) the relative height of the Earth's surface to the sea-level. These events or processes continuously change coastlines.

Old sea level mark in the Bay of Pozzuoli before uplift in 1982–1984.

New quay at the Bay of Pozzuoli

Volcanic activity can create new islands. For example, Surtsey Island in Iceland which has a diameter of 800 meters (2,600 ft), was created between November 1963 and June 1967. The island emerged from undersea vents that are part of the Vestmannaeyjar submarine volcanic system. Although the island has since partially eroded, but it is expected to last another 100 years.

Some earthquakes can create sudden variations of relative ground level and change the coastline dramatically. Structurally controlled coasts include the San Andreas Fault zone in California and the seismic Mediterranean belt (from Gibraltar to Greece).

The Bay of Pozzuoli, in Pozzuoli, Italy experienced hundreds of tremors between August 1982 and December 1984. The tremors, which reached a peak on October 4, 1983, damaged 8,000 buildings in the city center and raised the sea bottom by almost 2 meters (6.6 ft). This rendered the Bay of Pozzuoli too shallow for large craft and required the reconstruction of the harbor with new quays. The photo at the upper right shows the harbor before the uplift while the one on the bottom right shows the new quay.

=== Gradual processes ===
The gradual evolution of beaches often comes from the interaction of longshore drift, a wave-driven process by which sediments move along a beach shore, and other sources of erosion or accretion, such as nearby rivers.

==== Deltas ====
Deltas are nourished by alluvial systems and accumulate sand and silt, growing where the sediment flux from land is large enough to avoid complete removal by coastal currents, tides, or waves.

Most modern deltas are formed during the last five thousand years, after the present sea-level high stand was attained. However, not all sediment remains permanently in place: in the short term (decades to centuries), exceptional river floods, storms or other energetic events may remove significant portions of delta sediment or change its lobe distribution (pattern in which sediments are deposited across Delta, forming distinct, lobe shaped structures) and, on longer geological time scales, sea-level fluctuations lead to the destruction of deltaic features.

==== Subsidence and uplift related sea-level changes ====
Subsidence is the motion of the Earth's surface downward relative to the sea level due to internal geodynamic causes, It can occur naturally or due to human activities. The opposite of subsidence is uplift, which increases elevation.

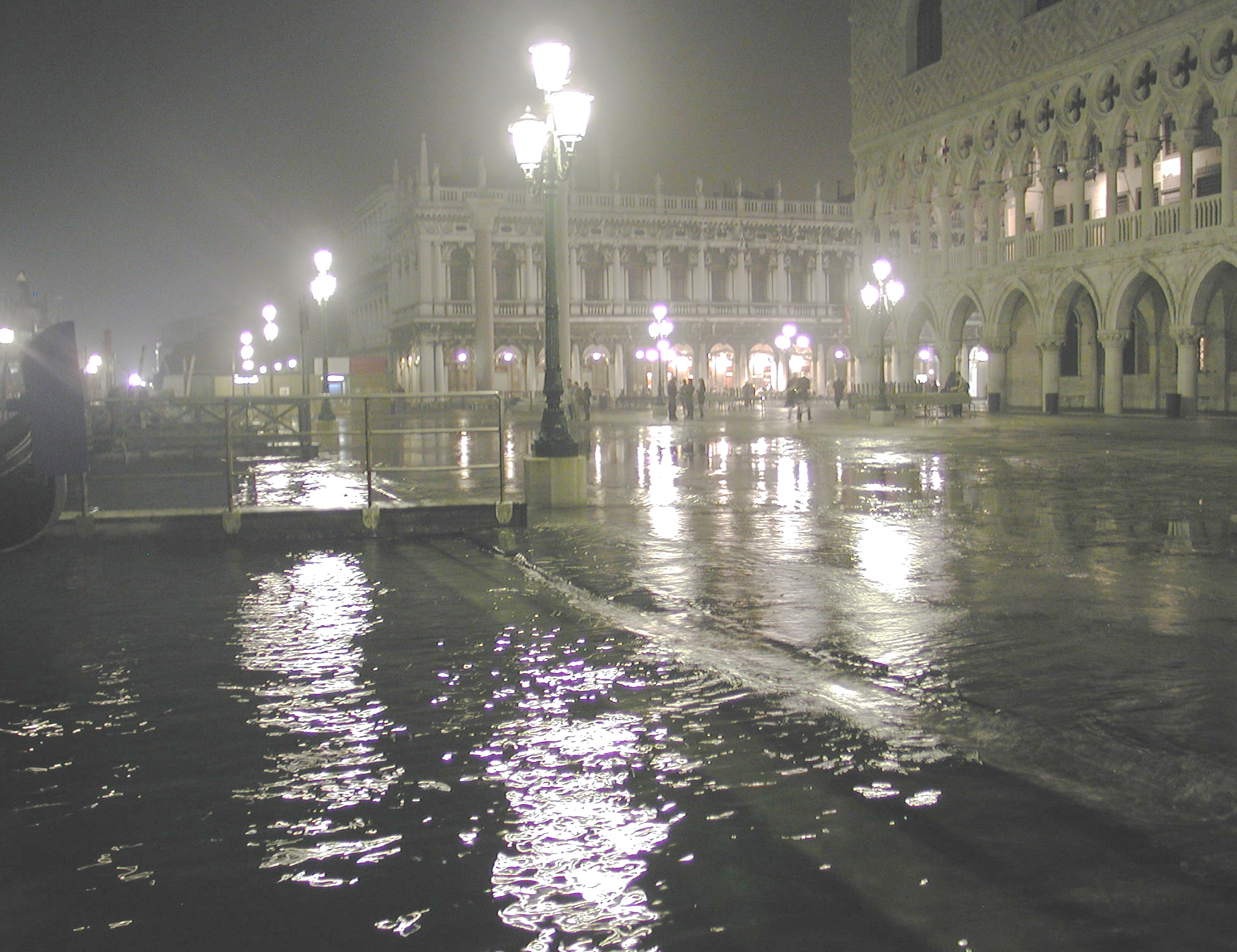
St. Mark's Square, Venice, during flooding

Venice is probably the best-known example of a subsiding location. Built suspended over a coastal lagoon, it experiences periodic flooding when extreme high tides or surges arrive; St Mark's Square is built only 55 centimeters above sea level. This phenomenon is caused by the compaction of young sediments in the Po River delta area, magnified by subsurface water and gas exploitation. Man-made works to solve this progressive sinking have been unsuccessful.

Mälaren, the third-largest lake in Sweden, is an example of deglacial uplift. It was once a bay on which seagoing vessels were once able to sail far into the country's interior, but it ultimately became a lake. Its uplift was caused by deglaciation: the removal of the weight of ice-age glaciers caused rapid uplift of the depressed land. For 2,000 years as the ice was unloaded, uplift proceeded at about 7.5 centimeters (3.0 in)/year. Once deglaciation was complete, uplift slowed to about 2.5 centimeters (0.98 in) annually, and it decreased exponentially after that. Today, annual uplift rates are 1 centimeter (0.39 in) or less, and studies suggest that rebound will continue for about another 10,000 years. The total uplift from the end of deglaciation may be up to 400 meters (1,300 ft).

== Beach management ==
Coastal and oceanic landforms.

Integrated coastal zone management minimizes the negative human impacts on coasts, enhances coastal defense, mitigates the risk associated with the sea level rise and other natural hazards.

The beach erosion is a type of bioerosion which alters the coastal geography through beach morphodynamics. There are numerous incidents of modern recession of beaches, mainly due to the longshore drift and coastal development hazards related to human activities.

Solutions range from "do nothing" to "Move beach seaward" approach which uses the elements of hard and soft engineering. The interventionist methods, such as "Move beach seaward", combine the hard engineering methods such as constructing structures (accropodes) with the soft engineering methods such as sand dune stabilization. These intervention are aimed at prevention of beach erosion caused by longshore drift and coastal development hazards, as well as facilitation of beach evolution and expansion.

=== Coastal planning approaches ===
Five general coastal planning approaches.

Five generic planning approaches involved in coastal defense are:

- Abandonment of shore: do nothing, let the natural process takeover.
- Managed retreat, also called realignment.
- Hold the shoreline: by using shoreline hardening techniques to create permanent concrete and rock constructions such as groynes.
- Move beach seaward: by using hard and soft intervention techniques usually in areas of high economic significance.
- Limited intervention: usually in areas of low economic significance, often includes the succession of haloseres, including salt marshes and sand dunes.

=== Coastal engineering ===
Coastal engineering techniques can be classified into two categories: hard engineering methods and soft engineering methods

==== Hard engineering methods ====
Hard engineering methods are also called "Structural methods". "Move towards the sea" beach accretion can be facilitated by the four main type of hard engineering structures, namely seawall, revetment, groyne or breakwater. Most commonly used hard structures are seawall and series of "headland groyne" (breakwater connected to the shore with groyne).

===== Main types of structures =====
Four main types of structures or accropodes are seawalls, groynes, breakwater and revetments. Headland groynes are a combination of breakwater and groyne.

====== Seawalls ======
Seawalls re-direct most of the incident energy in the form of sloping revetments, resulting in low reflected waves and much reduced turbulence. Designs use porous designs of rock or concrete objects such as Tetrapods or Xblocs with flights of steps for beach access. Seawall at Cronulla beach, NSW, for example, uses concrete wall. Submerged seawalls or structures are constructed to create the underwater reefs to slow down wave energy and beach erosion.

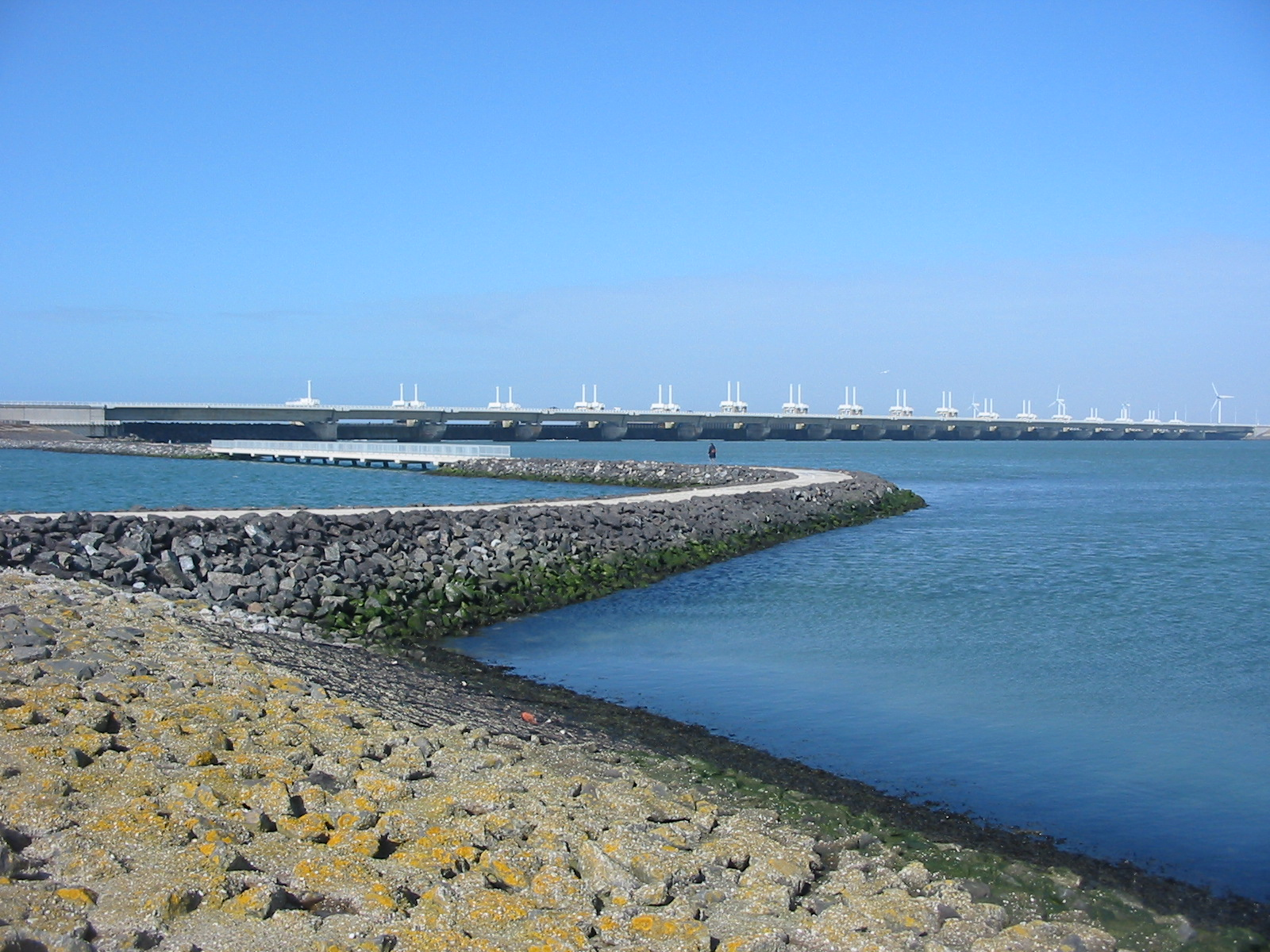
Sea wall in the Netherlands that does allow the tide and organisms through, but brakes wave energy.

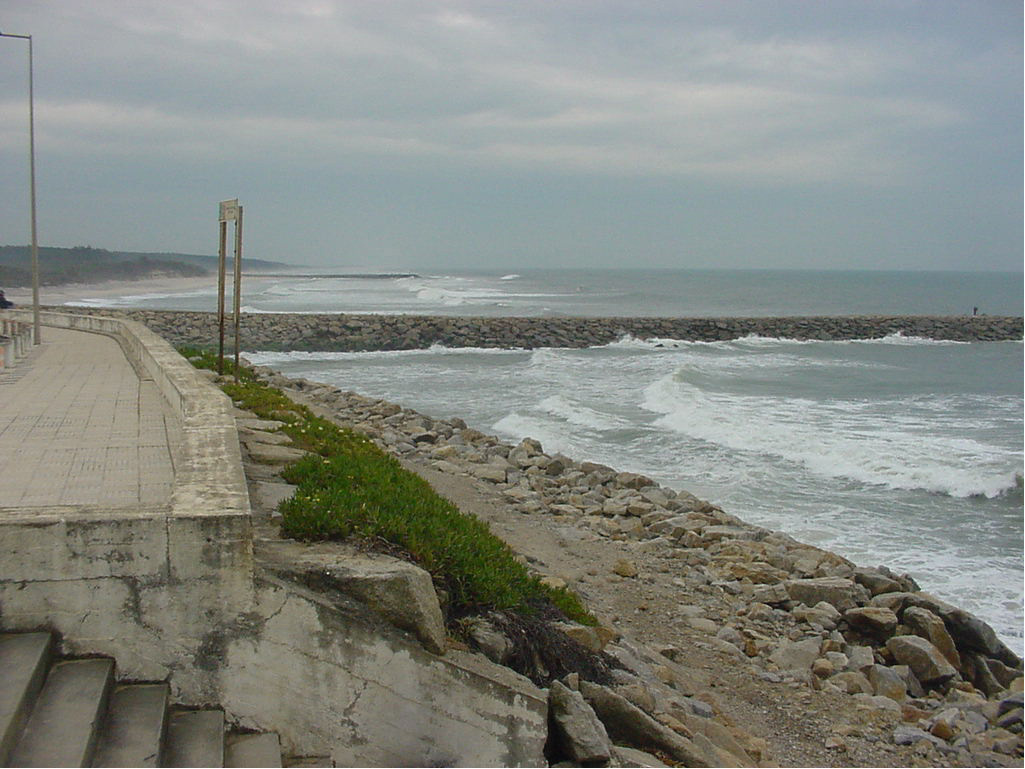
Stone Seawall with cemented walkway, mud revetment stabilized with grass, and gravel riprap armament at the base.

====== Groynes and Headland groyne ======
Groynes are the walls perpendicular to the coastline. Groynes are generally placed in series and the areas between groups of groynes are called groyne fields. To directs the sand towards the shore targeted for sand accumulation, a shorter groyne turned slightly towards downdrift side of the beach is deployed at updrift end of the beach, a longer groyne at the downdrift end of the beach is deployed, a series of groyne are deployed between the two ends. Groynes are often made of gabion, greenharts, concrete, rock or wood. Material builds up on the downdrift side, where littoral drift is predominantly in one direction, creating a wider and a more plentiful beach. Groynes are cost-effective, require little maintenance and are one of the most common defences.

Headland groyne or Bulkhead breakwater
When groyne is built to attach a breakwater to shore, the resulting T-structure is called "headland breakwater", "headland groyne", "bulkhead groyne" or "bulkhead breakwater". Use of groynes and headland groyne, accumulates the sand across the beach but it tend to deplete the sand faster from the downdrift end of the beach. This can be mitigated and sand could be accumulated at the downdrift end of the beach also. This is achieved by having a longer "groyne" or "headland groyne" at the end of downdrift side of the beach. To enhance the sand accumulation, this "headland groyne" could have another series of smaller "headland groyne" jutting out of it pointing towards updrift end of the beach in a way that the smaller "headland groyne" are parallel to the shore and perpendicular to main "headland groyne". This will facilitate gradual natural creation of ayre (sand or gravel filled beach). If there is a near shore island near the downdrift end of the beach and "headland groyne", then this could be turned into a cuspate foreland headland with the use of the gradual natural creation of ayre (gravel filled beach). Main "headland groyne" at the end of downdrift could be further stabilized by a hard engineered detention basin and grassy mangrove salt marsh. Salt marsh could be created with the use of soft engineering approach, such as lose stone sills, while leaving a whole in the sill for a seawater channel. Seawater channel could be a cemented open channel or a pipe buried under the beach. This marsh could be designed to taper into a hard engineered sandy beach. Having inland saltwater marsh between the beach and mainland will lower the cost by eliminating the need for filling up the marshy area with the sand, and the mangroves and grasses in the marsh will facilitate gradual built up of sediments.

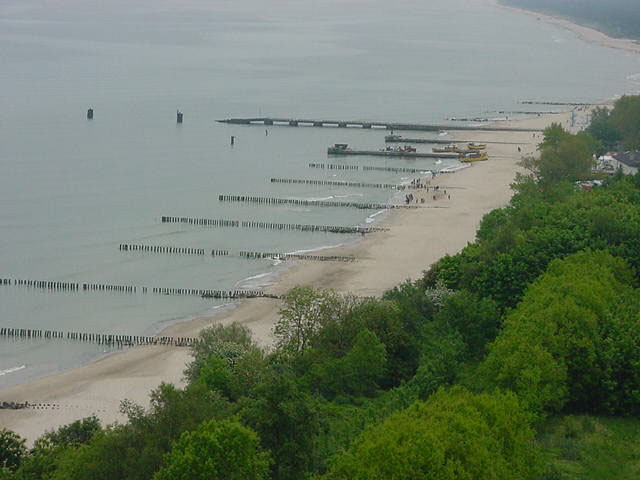
Series of cost effective groynes made of wood.

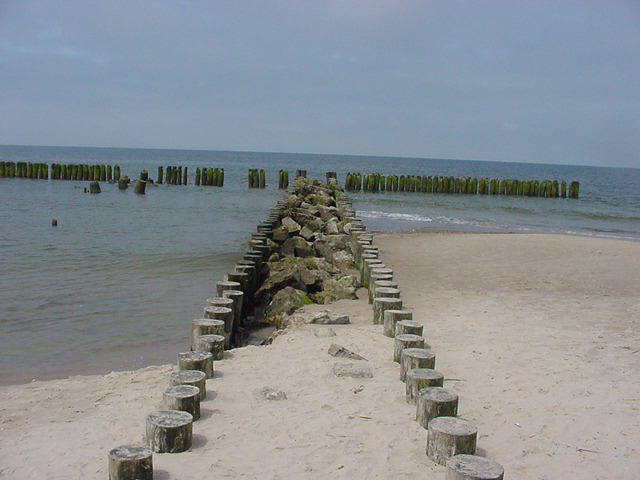
"Headland groyne" with wood log breakwater and stone filled wooden groyne, an easy to build cost effective option made of cheap and native materials.

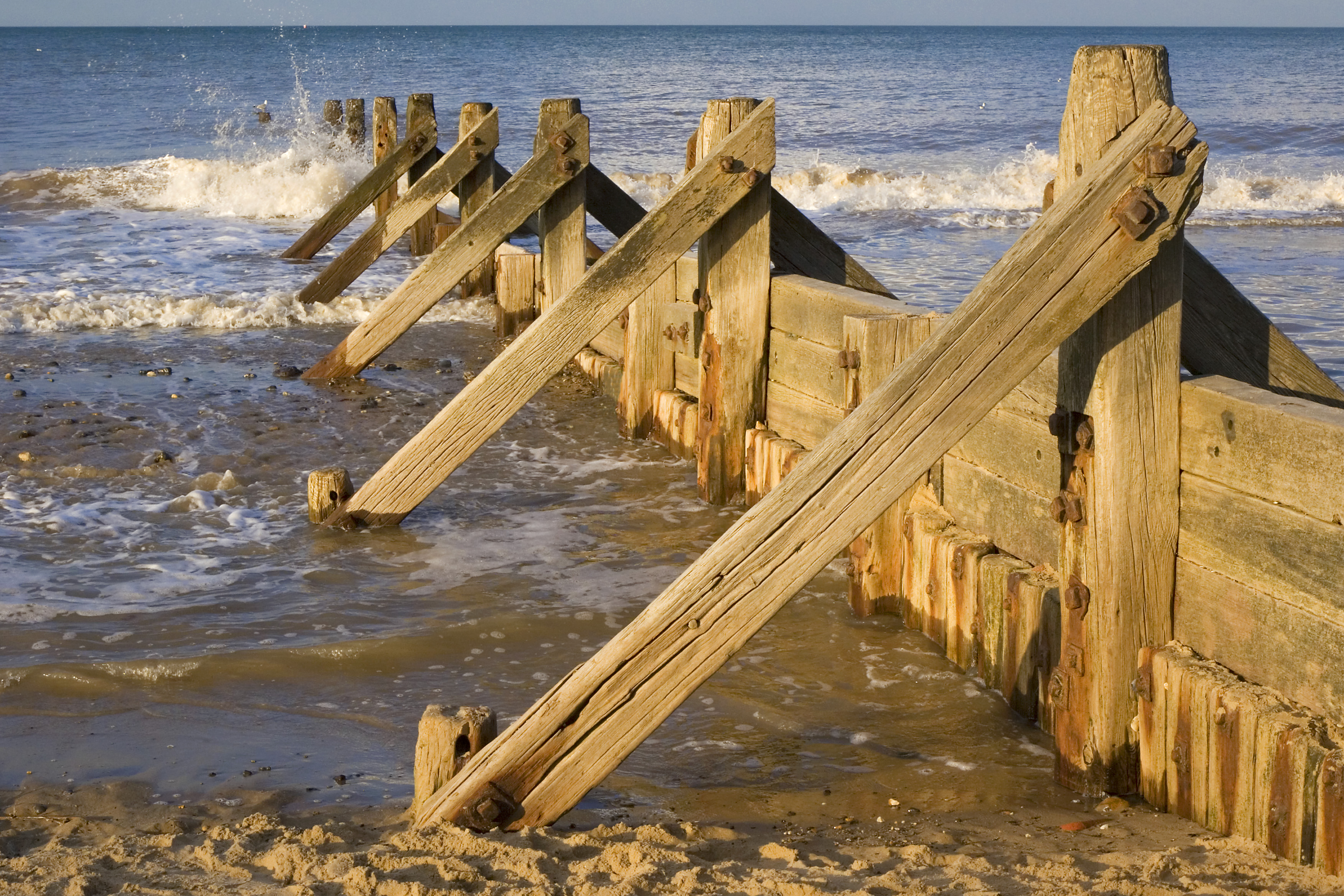
Groyne at Mundesley, Norfolk, UK.

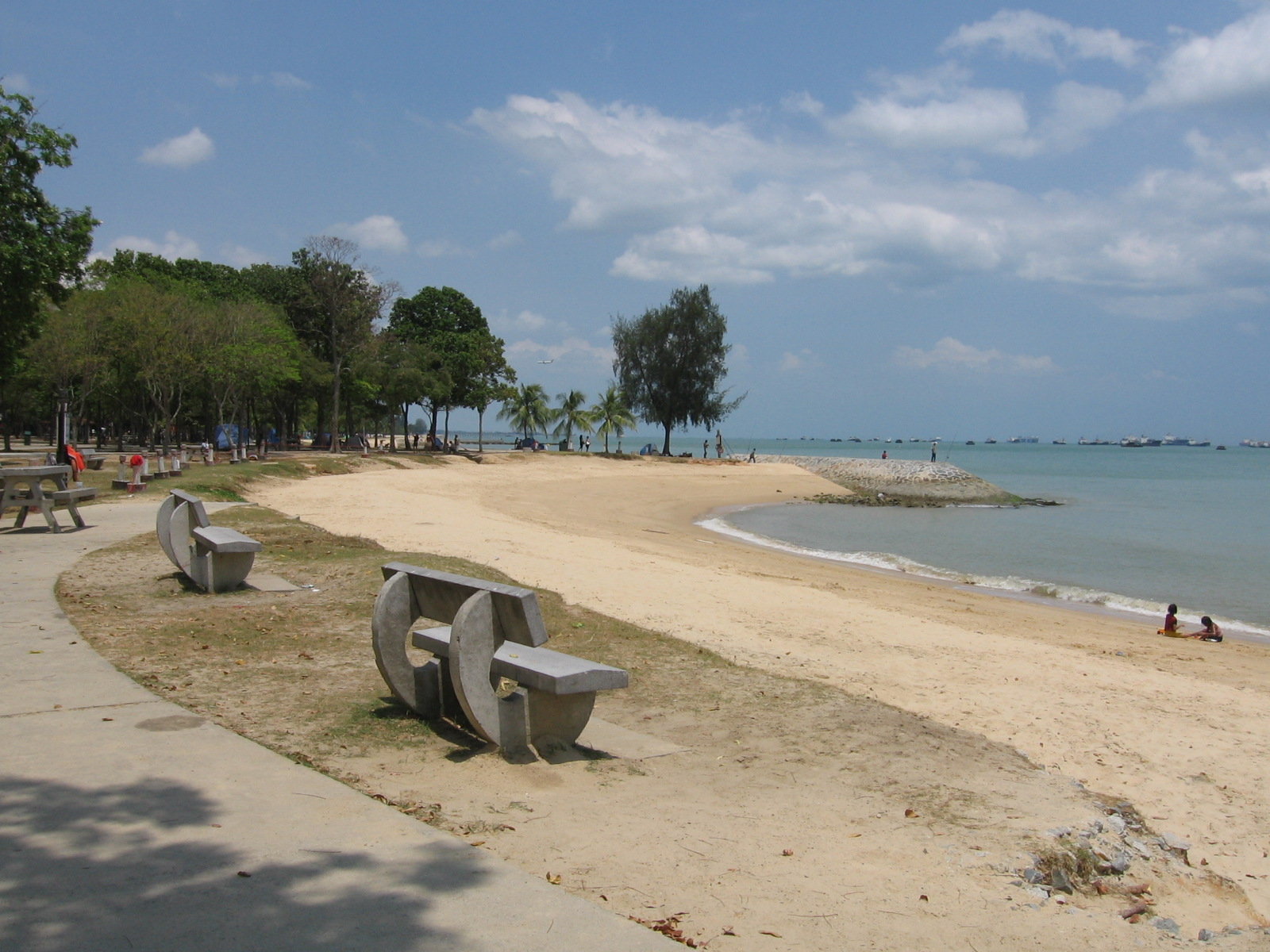
"Headland groyne" at East Coast Beach in Singapore consists of breakwater parallel to shore and connected to shore by a vertical groyne. Higher mainland is fortified with a low rise mud seawall which has been further stabilized by planting grass and trees.

====== Breakwater ======
Breakwater, also called "offshore breakwater", are offshore structure constructed parallel to the shore to alter wave direction and tide energy. The waves break further offshore and therefore lose erosive power. This leads to formation of wider beaches, which further absorb wave energy. A series of breakwaters is often deployed across the beach shore.

====== Revetment ======
Revetments are slanted or upright blockades, built parallel to the coast, usually towards the back of the beach to protect the area beyond. The most basic revetments consist of timber slants with a possible rock infill. Waves break against the revetments, which dissipate and absorb the energy. The shoreline is protected by the beach material held behind the barriers, as the revetments trap some of the material. Unless other methods are used in combination, surf progressively erodes and destroys the revetment which requires ongoing maintenance.

===== Other types of structures =====
====== Riprap / Rock armour ======
Rock armour, also called riprap, is basement placed at the sea edge using local material. This could be the protruding foot of a seawall or revetment to reduce maintenance of those. Longshore drift is not hindered.

====== Cliff stabilization ======
Cliff stabilization can be accomplished through drainage of excess rainwater of through terracing, planting and wiring to hold cliffs in place.

====== Floodgates ======
Floodgates prevent damage from storm surges or any other type of natural disaster that could harm the area they protect. They are habitually open and allow free passage, but close under threat of a storm surge. The Thames Barrier is an example of such a structure.

===== Construction elements =====
These construction elements can be incorporated in any of the above structures, either as core element or as a supplementary element to enhance to reduce the cost and maintenance of main structural elements.

====== Concrete objects ======
These are complex reinforced concrete objects, such as A-jack, Akmon, Dolos, Honeycomb sea wall (Seabees), KOLOS, Tetrapod and Xbloc. Simple concrete blocks have been replaced by these complex concrete objects because these objects are more resistant to wave action and require less concrete to produce a superior result. These could be used to build seawalls, groynes, breakwaters, and other structures including residential buildings. Tetrapods used along Marine Drive, Mumbai are an example of complex concrete objects.

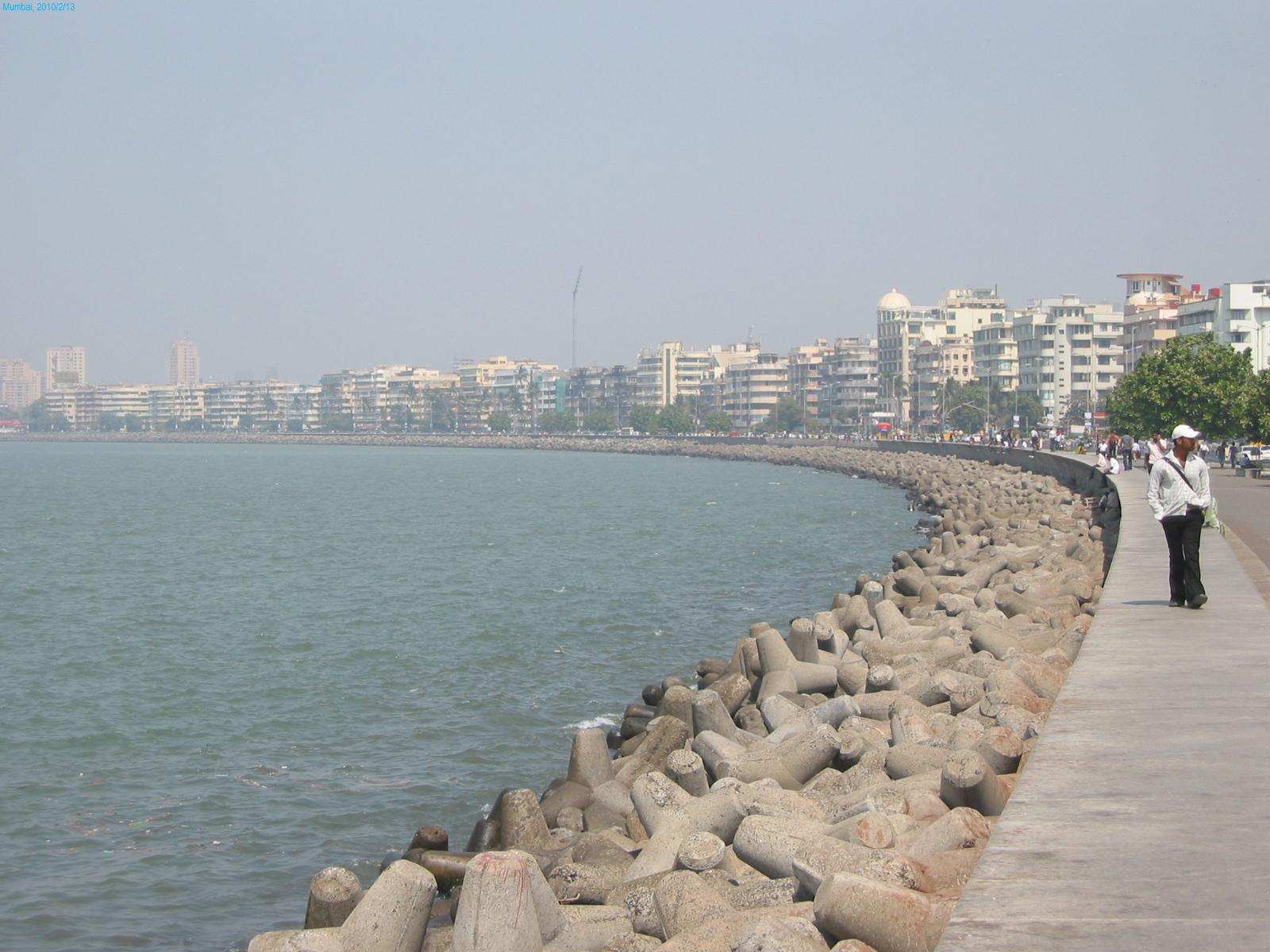
Tetrapods, Marine Drive, Mumbai.

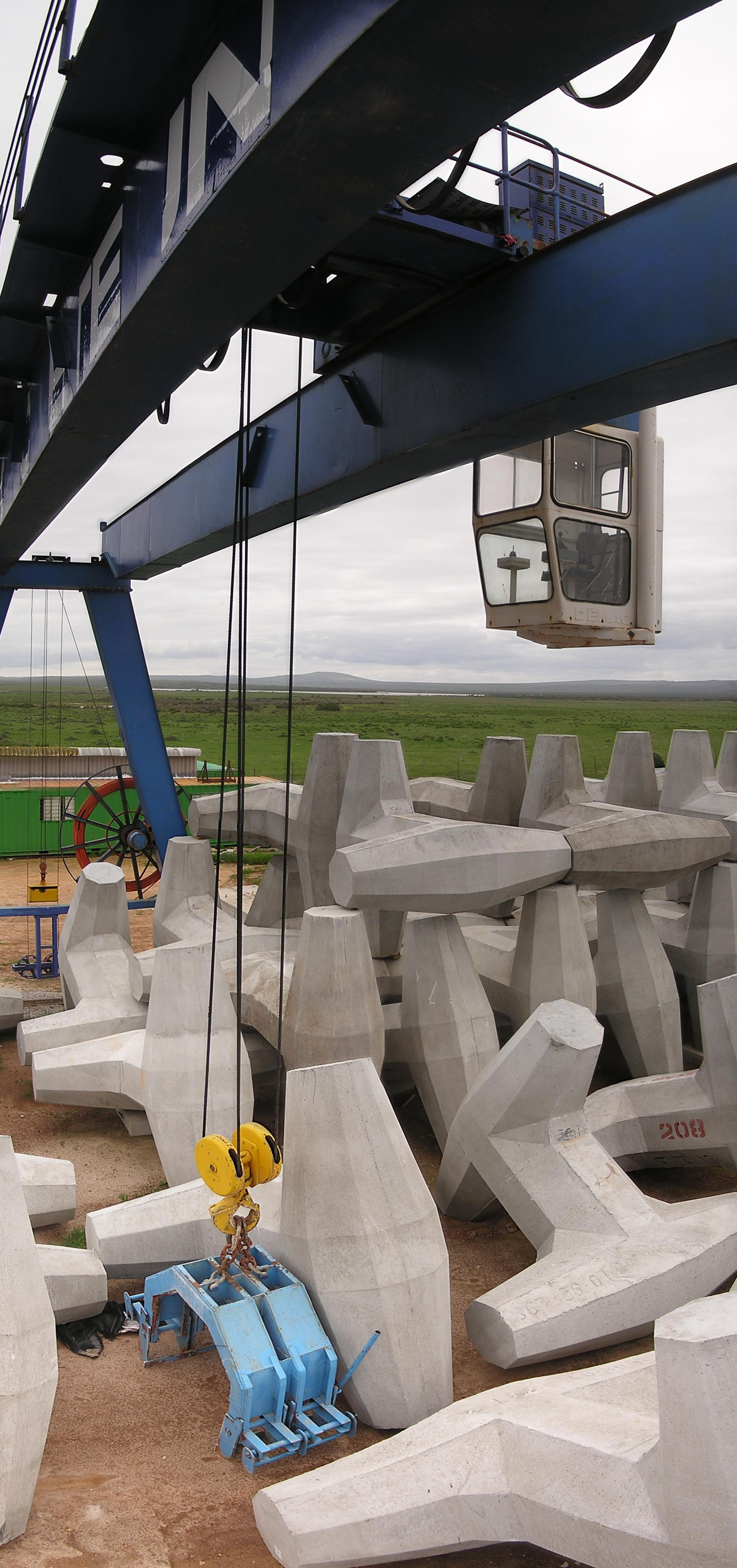
Dolos.

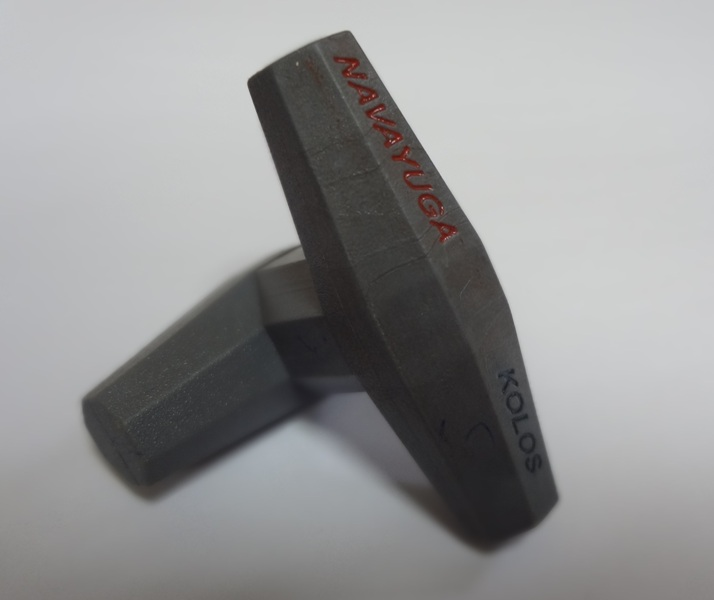
KOLOS.

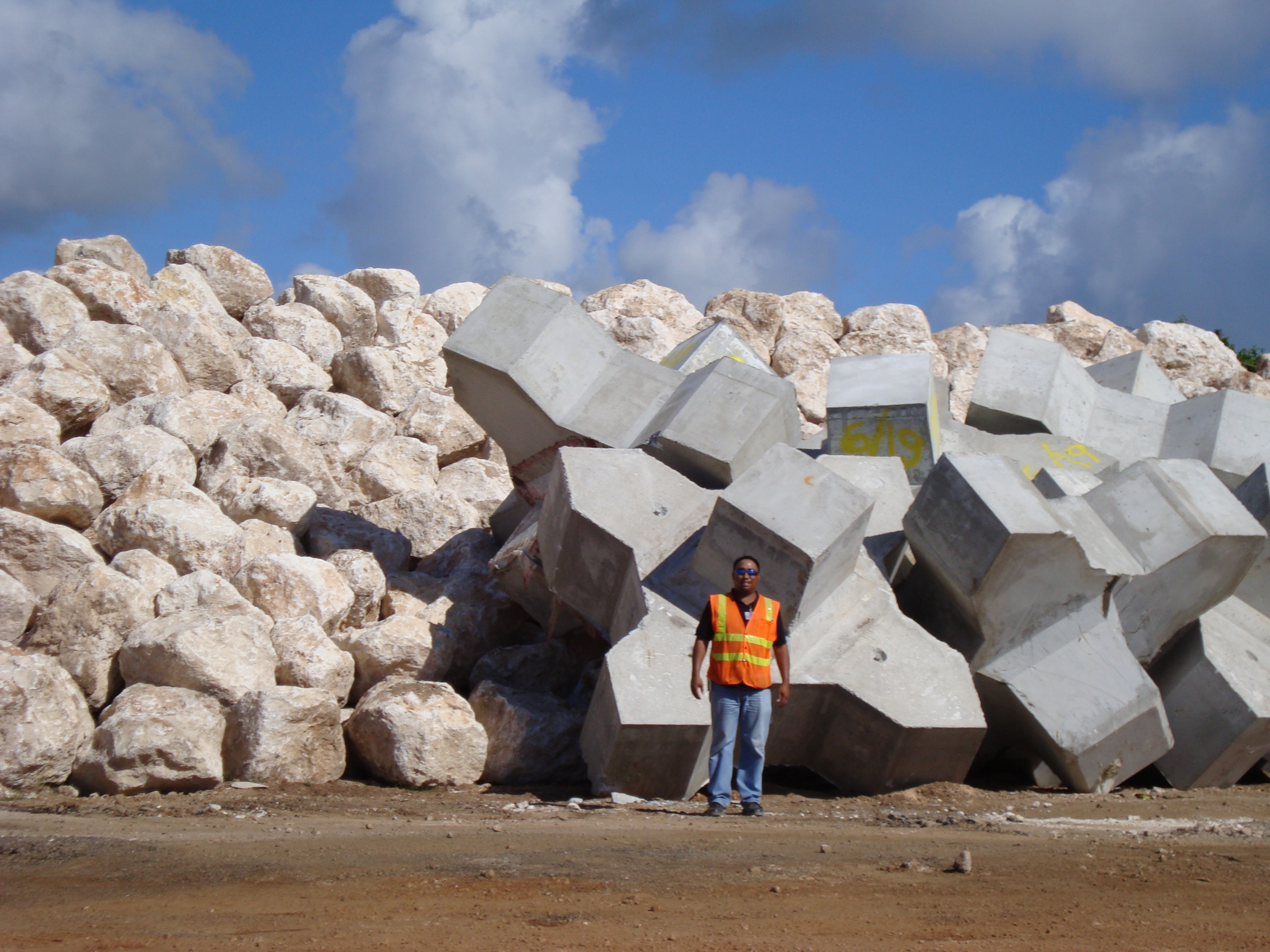
Xblocs.

====== Gabions ======
Gabions are constructed by wiring boulders and rocks into mesh cages and placed in front of areas vulnerable to erosion, sometimes at cliffs edges or at right angles to the beach. When the ocean lands on the gabion, the water drains through leaving sediment, while the structure absorbs a moderate amount of wave energy. Gabions need to be securely tied to protect the structure. They can be used to build seawalls, groynes, breakwaters, revetments, buildings, underwater reefs, etc.,

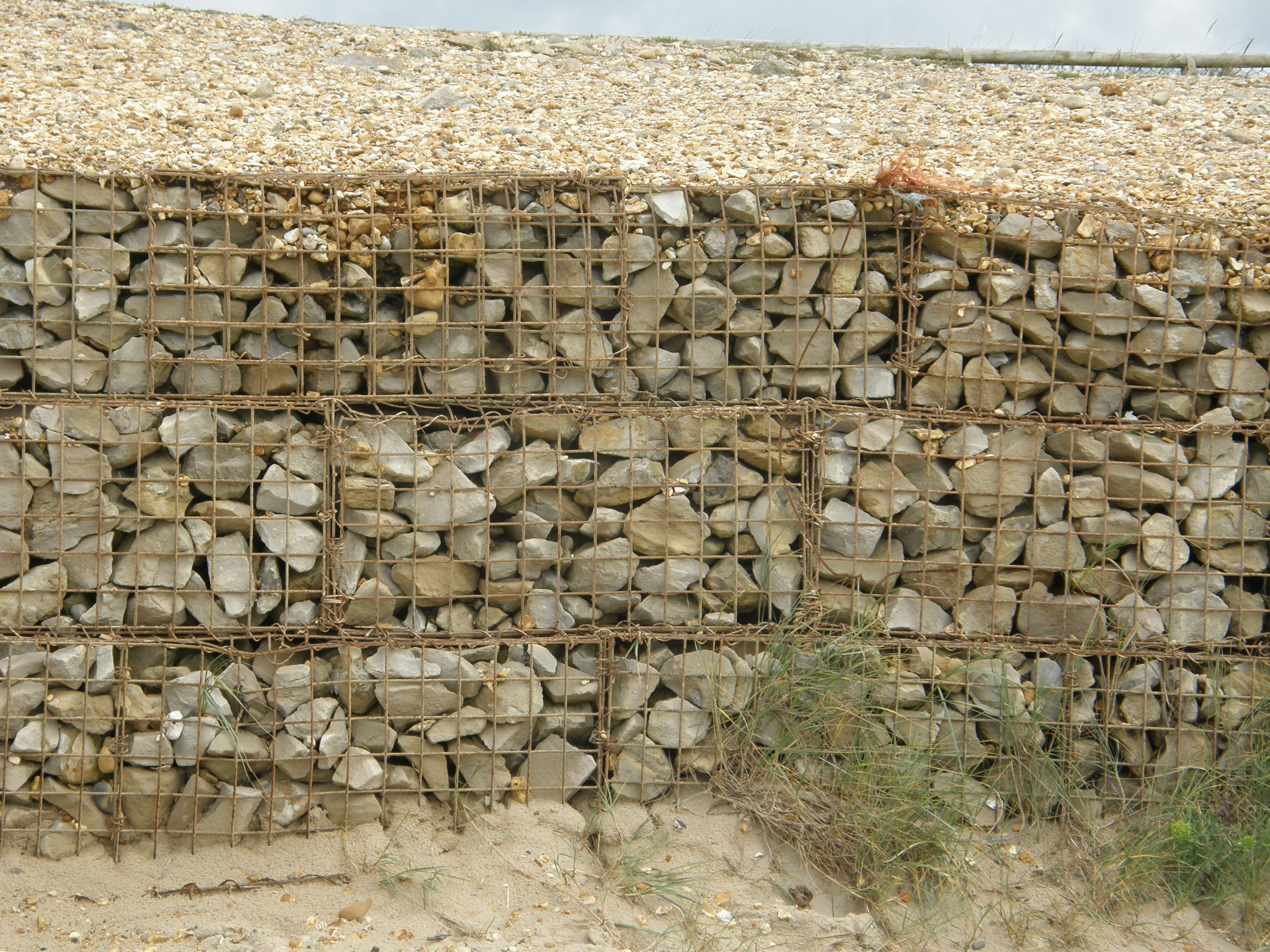
Gabion, welded wiremesh filled with stone.

==== Soft engineering methods ====
Soft engineering uses a "soft" (non-permanent) structure by creating a larger sand reservoir, pushing the shoreline seaward. It gained popularity because it preserved beach resources and avoided the negative effects of hard structures.

===== Managed retreat =====
Managed retreat means the shoreline is left to erode, while relocating buildings and infrastructure further inland.

===== Beach evolution =====
Beach evolution, also called "beach replenishment" or "beach nourishment", it involves importing sand from elsewhere and adding it to the existing beach. The imported sand should be of a similar quality to the existing beach material so it can meld with the natural local processes and without adverse effects. Without the groynes or scheme requires repeated applications on an annual or multi-year cycle. Beach nourishment can be used in combination with seaward curving half-moon shaped "headland breakwater" structure, this combining the benefits of breakwater and groyne structures.

===== Sand dune stabilization =====
Sand dune stabilization protects beaches by catching windblown sand, increasing natural beach formation. Fences can allow sand traps to create blowouts and increase windblown sand capture. Plants such as Ammophila (Marram grass) can bind the sediment.

===== Beach drainage =====
The beach face dewatering lowers the water table locally beneath the beach face. This causes accretion of sand above the drainage system.

=== Cost considerations ===
The costs of installation, operation and maintenance vary due to:

- system length (non-linear cost elements)
- flow rates (sand permeability, power costs)
- soil conditions (presence of rock or impermeable strata)
- discharge arrangement /filtered seawater utilization
- drainage design, materials selection & installation methods
- geographical considerations (location logistics)
- regional economic considerations (local capabilities /costs, availability of local material and native skilled workforce)
- study requirements /consent process.

=== An illustrative example ===
Salt marsh during low tide, mean low tide, high tide and very high tide (spring tide).

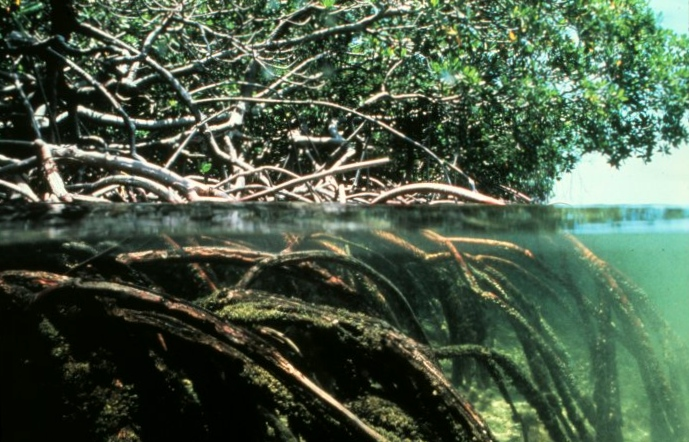
Mangrove's above and below water view at the edge of the shore.

This Integrated coastal zone management example is based on the "move beach seaward" general planning approach which involves both hard and soft engineering methods. This scenario minimizes the maintenance effort and cost by making optimal use of the coastal geography by incorporating natural coastal geographical features in the engineering design. The cost is kept low by the use of easily available free or cost-effective local material, use of which is already known to or easily acquired by the local workforce. This solution entails beach nourishment (creating recreational area by filling with sand), and further beach expansion and prevention of beach erosion caused by longshore drift and coastal development hazards. The design makes use of a shorter groyne slightly inclined toward the beach in the same direction as downdrift, with a series of "headland groyne" perpendicular to the shore, and a longer "headland groyne" at the end of downdrift side of the beach with smaller "headland groyne" perpendicular to it facing the updrift end of the beach.

This example of tropical setting, part of the sea could be reclaimed by building a seawall with revetment (slope) fortified with armament of honeycomb seebee made of concrete with hexagonal holes, parts of seawall could be made of gabion. Seawall will sit over gravel or rock. Seawall could be a mix of vertical structures in the areas where more space is needed and tapering revetments (slope) as aesthetic landscaping feature. Revetments could be made of locally available material. Different parts of revetment could have different material and design, such as gabion (welded wire mesh filled with stone, gravel and wood) and honeycomb seebee (made of concrete with hexagonal holes). Honeycomb seebee or gabion could be used in the downdrift areas, though wood groyne would be the cheapest option such as used at Mundesley. Other areas of seawall and revetment could be a mix of cemented low walls, gabion, riprap made of gravel or sand bags. Parts of seawall and revetment could be left exposed especially those made of decorative gabion, and others parts could be covered with low or mid level native plants. Seawall will sit over gravel or rock base which could be wider than the seawall so that it also acts as the riprap armament.

Reclaimed area could be filled with the sand and stabilized by aesthetic landscaping by growing native trees and plants. A dense layer of native tropical trees could be planted at the mainland side of the reclaimed land with due consideration to the height of the trees that they do not block the view of any construction such as resort or beach house. Reclaimed area would enhance the economical value by creating a sand filled safe recreation area which might house sunbathing areas and inland freshwater or seawater wading pool or lagoon surrounded by bars, restaurants, water sports, etc. Restaurants could have retractable-canopied areas set closer to the seawall greenified with tapering layers of evergreen native tropical plants. Bars could be open air, portable or canopied (thatched roof nipa hut and trellis of native material, pergola or beach parasol) bars with pool and beach seating. Seating could be relaxing-and-sprawling reclined futon type, sunken sand pits, sand filled bean bags on the beach, locally made designer stools/chairs and tables made of native eco-friendly natural material such as bamboo, aged rustic driftwood and abundant low weathering native wood.

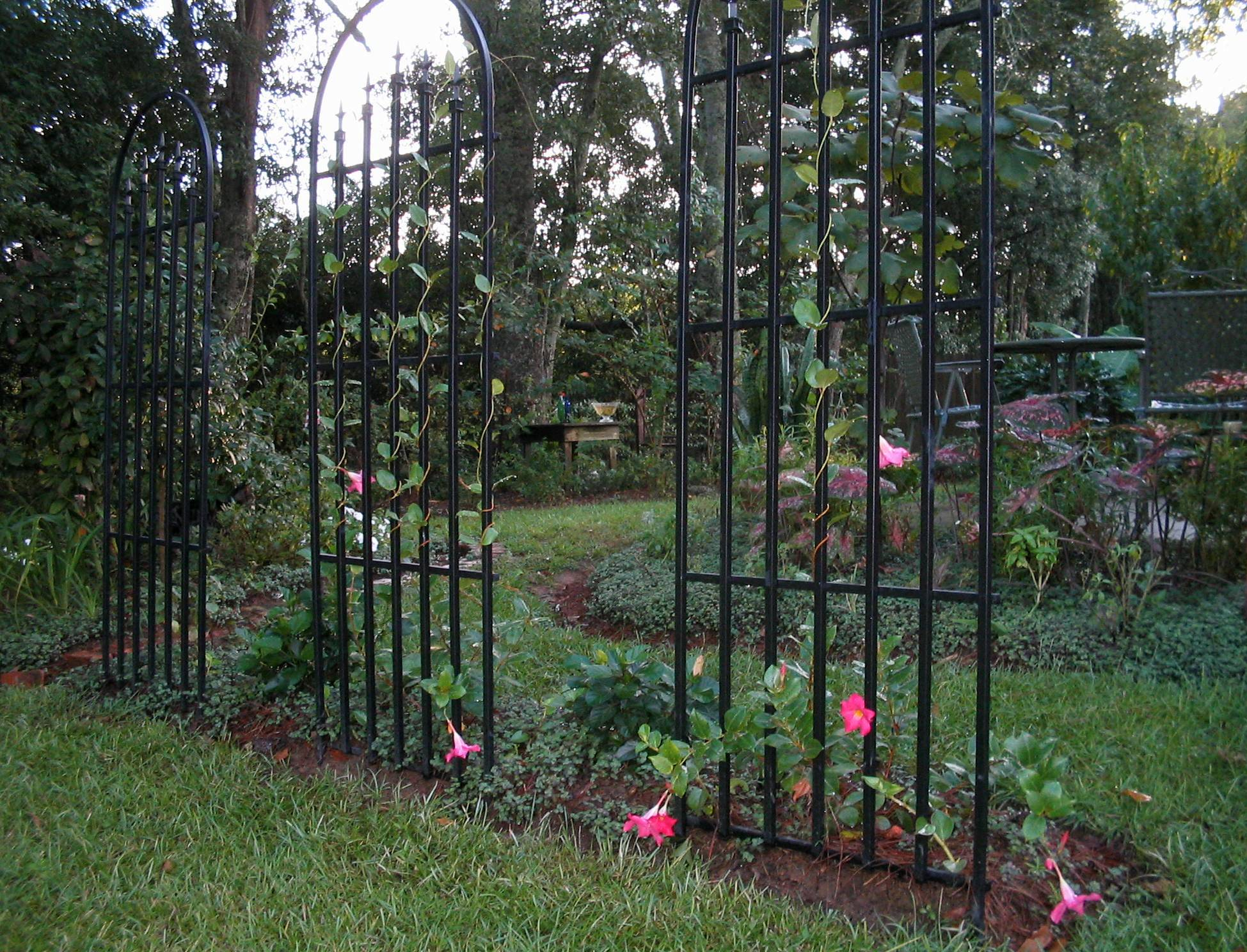
A series of trellises forms the wall of a garden room.

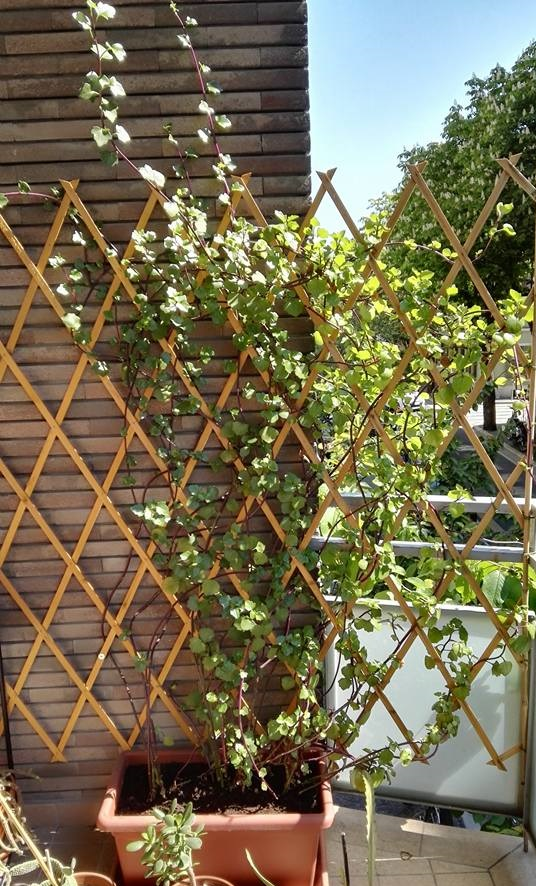
Creeping groundsel growing on a wooden trellis in Italy.

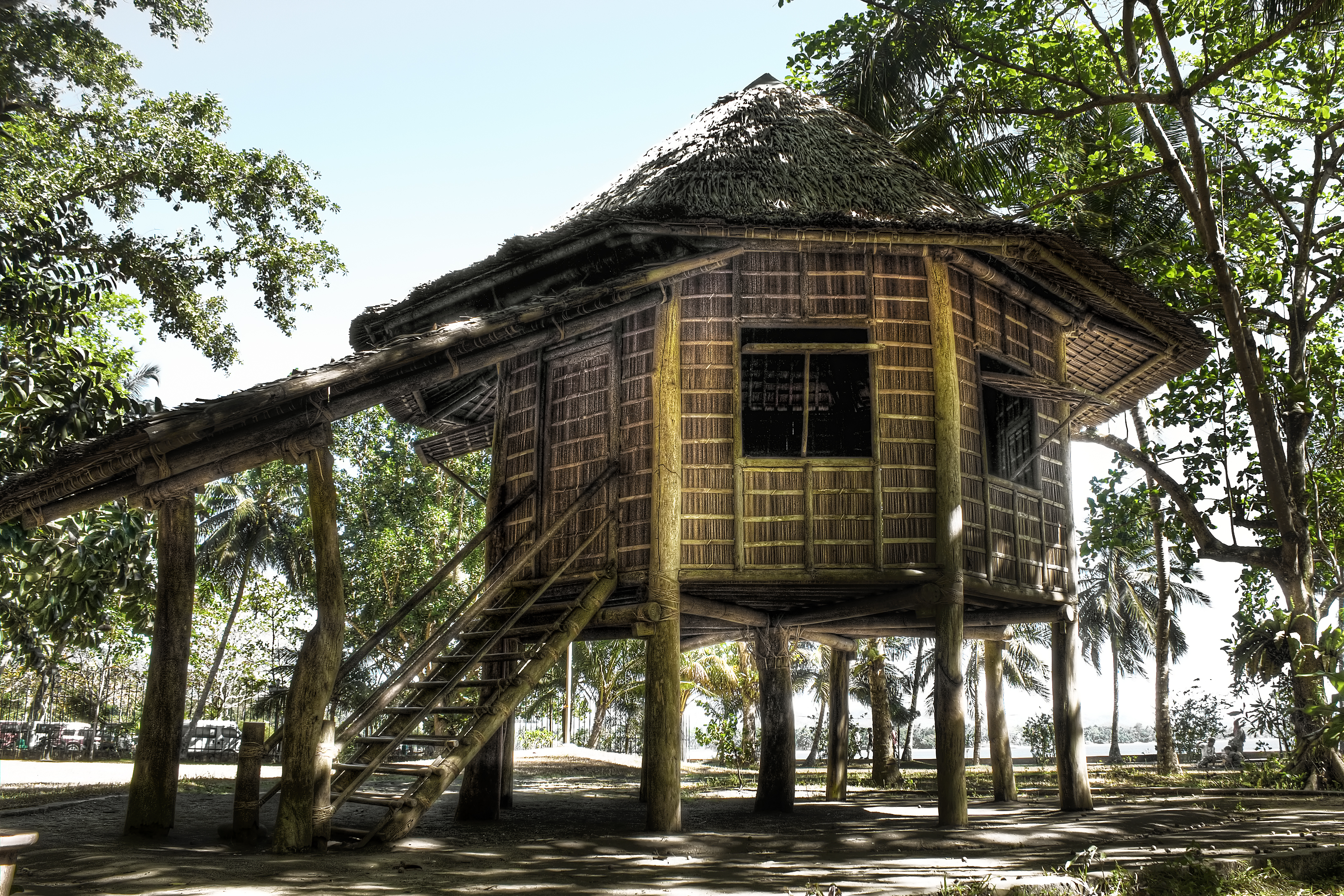
Casa Redonda, one of five nipa houses built by the Philippine national hero José Rizal during his exile in Dapitan.

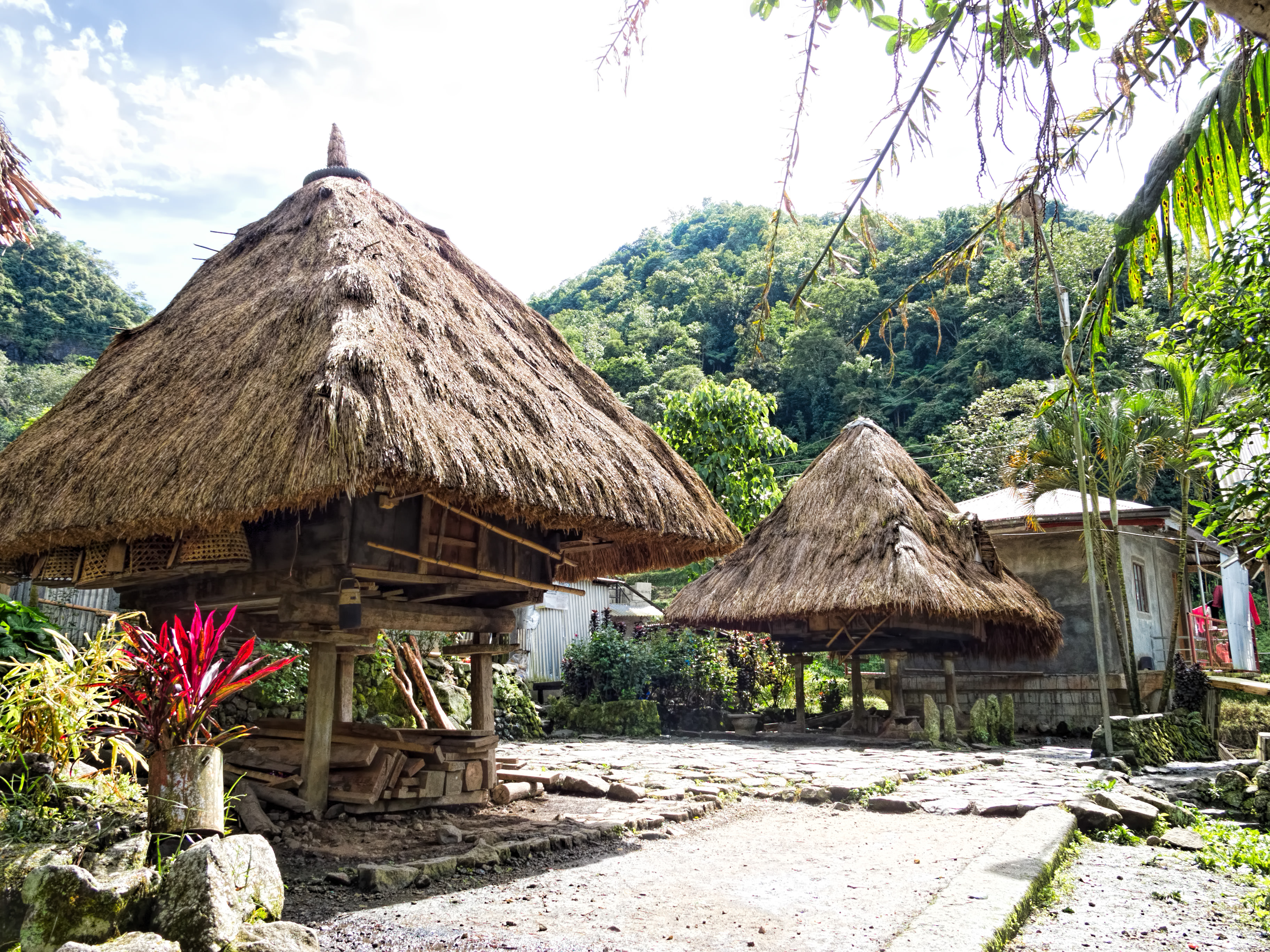
The raised bale houses of the Ifugao people.

== Status of beaches ==
=== Historical accretion of beaches ===
Main stages of Holocene evolution of the Rhone delta.

In the Mediterranean Sea, deltas have been continuously growing for the last several thousand years. Six to seven thousand years ago, the sea level stabilized, and continuous river systems, ephemeral torrents, and other factors began this steady accretion. Since intense human use of coastal areas is a relatively recent phenomenon (except in the Nile delta), beach contours were primarily shaped by natural forces until the last centuries.

In Barcelona, for example, the accretion of the coast was a natural process until the late Middle Ages, when harbor-building increased the rate of accretion.

The port of Ephesus, one of the great cities of the Ionian Greeks in Asia Minor, was filled with sediment due to accretion from a nearby river; it is now 5 kilometers (3.1 mi) from the sea. Likewise, Ostia, the once-important port near ancient Rome, is now several kilometres inland, the coastline having moved slowly seaward.

Bruges became a port during the early Middle Ages and was accessible by sea until around 1050. At that time, however, the natural link between Bruges and the sea silted up. In 1134, a storm flood opened a deep channel, the Zwin, linking the city to the sea until the fifteenth century via a canal from the Zwin to Bruges. Bruges had to use a number of outports, such as Damme and Sluis, for this purpose. In 1907, a new seaport was inaugurated in Zeebrugge.

=== Modern beach recession ===
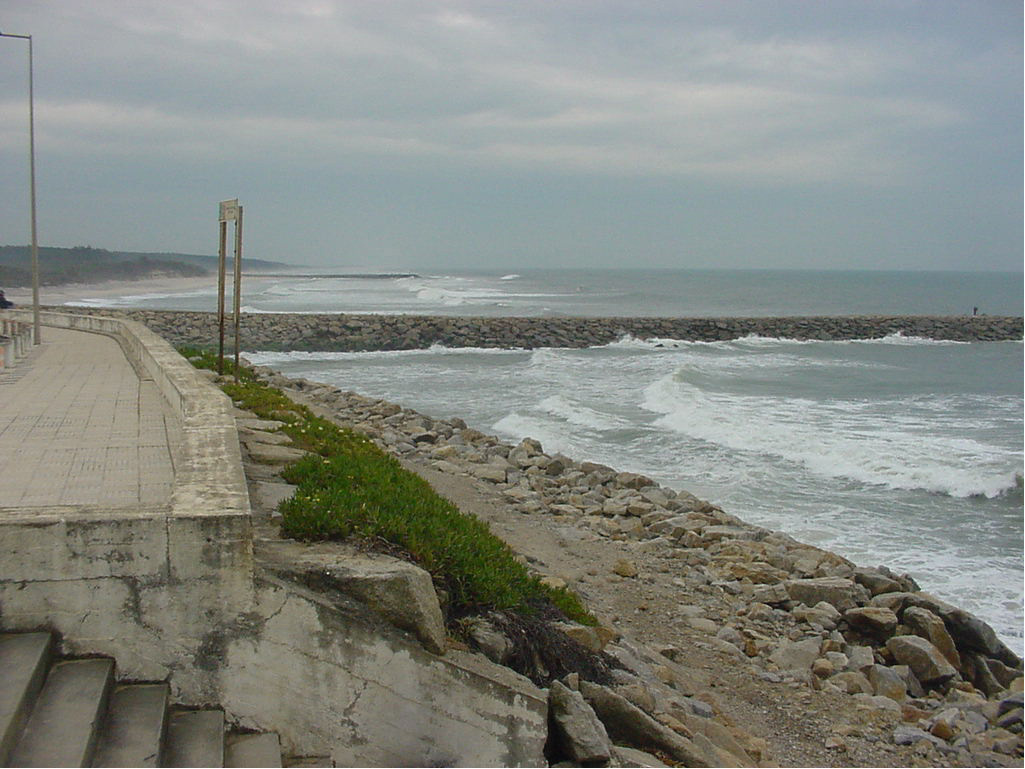
Eroding beach in Portugal.

At the present time, important segments of low coasts are in recession, losing sand and reducing beach dimensions. This loss can occur very rapidly. There are various reasons for beach recession, some more natural than others (degree of anthropization). Examples of this are occurring at Sète, in California, in Poland, in Aveiro (Portugal), and in the Netherlands and elsewhere along the North Sea. In Europe, coastal erosion is widespread (at least 70%) and distributed very irregularly.

==== California beaches ====
California's beaches and other shoreline features change according to the availability of beach sand, the wave and current energy impinging on the coast, and other physical processes that affect the movement of sand. A constant supply of sand is necessary for beaches to form and be maintained along this shoreline. Many human activities, including dam construction and river channelization, have reduced the supply of sand that reaches the ocean. This, in turn, has prevented beaches from being replenished and has thus created greater vulnerability for shorelines that have always been subject to varying levels of erosion. There are few practical solutions to improving sand supply from inland sources, so management of shoreline erosion will likely continue to focus at the land/sea interface along the California coastline.

Construction of breakwaters, jetties, or groyne fields to protect harbor entrances, maintain beaches, or protect coastal structures have both helped and harmed the movement of sand along the shoreline. Protective armoring formations trap sand and allow beaches to expand up-coast from the device, but can interrupt the flow of sand to beaches located down-coast.

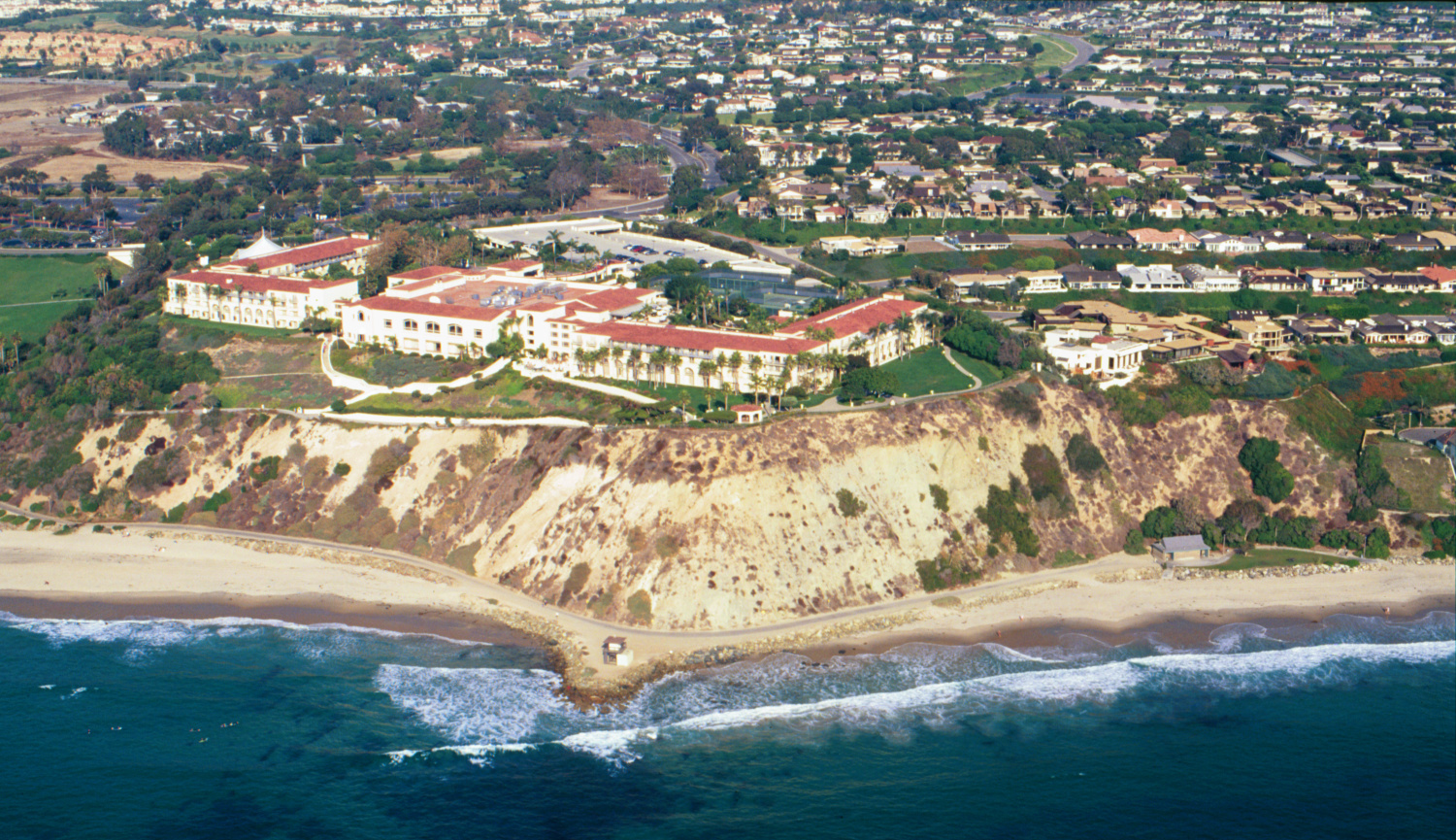
Southern California beach 10/97 (before winter storms boosted by El Niño)

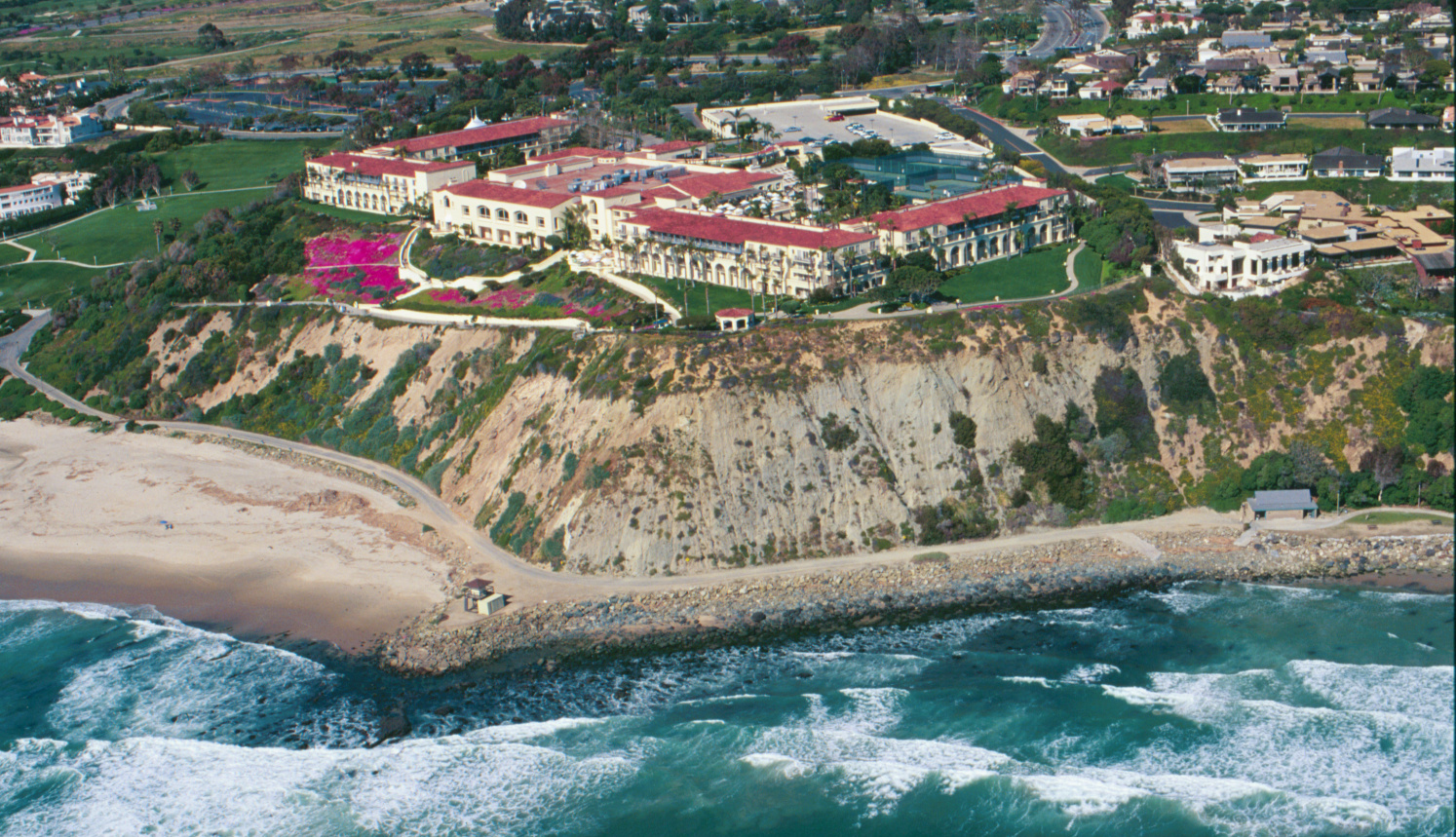
Same location 4/98 (after winter storms boosted by El Niño)

==== France ====
===== Atlantic coast =====
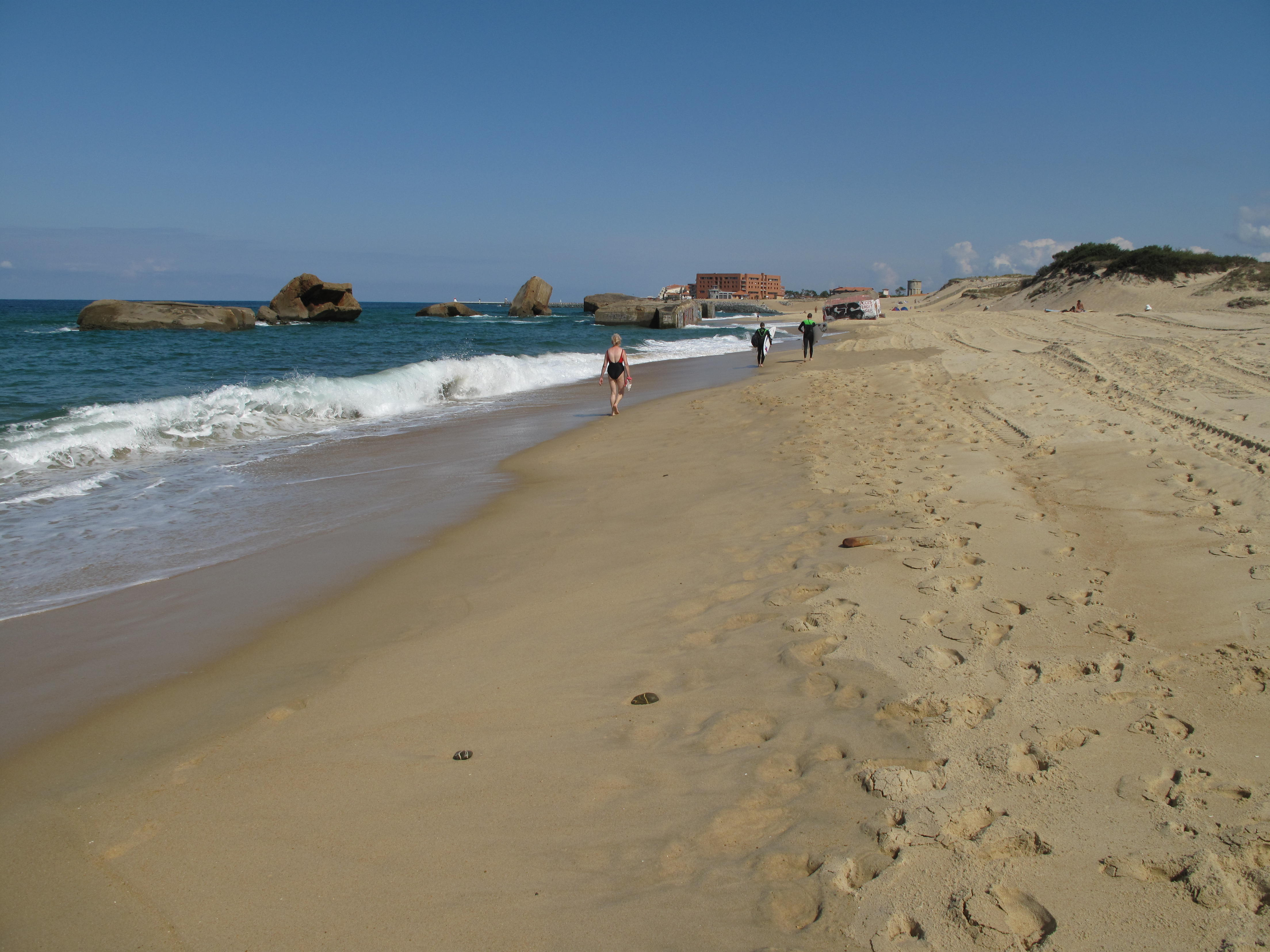
Old German-built WWII bunkers at Capbreton, south-west of France

Some of the coastal defence bunkers of the Atlantic Wall, built by the German soldiers during the Second World War at the top of the dunes were underwater 2/3 of the time 65 years after the war. It shows 200 meters of recession of the beach in 65 years.

===== Sète =====
The coast recession near Sète is related with coastal drift sand supply interruption due to growth of the Rhone delta, which (like most deltas) is becoming independent of the rest of the coast. The present lido shoreline is 210 meters away from the Roman lido.

==== Netherlands ====
Holland coast

The Dutch coast consists of sandy, multi-barred beaches and can be characterised as a wave-dominated coast. Approximately 290 km of the coast consists of dunes and 60 km is protected by structures such as dikes and dams. With the melting of the ice at the end of the last ice age, the coastline shifted eastward until about 5000 years ago the present position of the Dutch coastline was reached. As the sea level rise stagnated, the sand supply decreased and the formation of the beach ridges stopped, after which when the sea broke through the lines of dunes during storms, men started to defend the land by building primitive dikes and walls. The dunes, together with the beach and the shoreline, offer a natural, sandy defence to the sea. About 30% of the Netherlands lies below sea level.

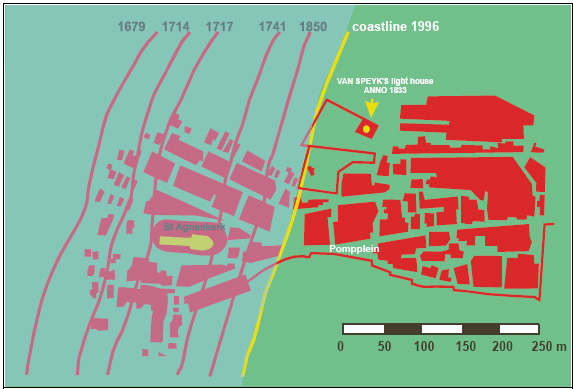
Holland coast recession

Over the last 30 years, approximately 1 million m^{3} sand per year has been lost from the Dutch coast to deep water. In most northern coastal sections, erosion occurs in deep water and also in the nearshore zone. In most southern sections, sedimentation occurs in the nearshore zone and erosion in deep water. Structural erosion is due to sea-level rise relative to the land and, in some spots, it is caused by harbour dams. The Dutch coast looked at as a single unit shows erosive behaviour. Approximately 12 million m^{3} of sand is transferred annually from the North Sea to the Wadden Sea as a result of relative rising sea level and coastal erosion.

==== Poland ====
During the last glaciation, the Baltic Polish area was covered in ice and associated morainal sediments. Deglaciation left a substantial amount of unconsolidated sediment. Currently, these unconsolidated sediments are strongly eroded and reworked by the sea.

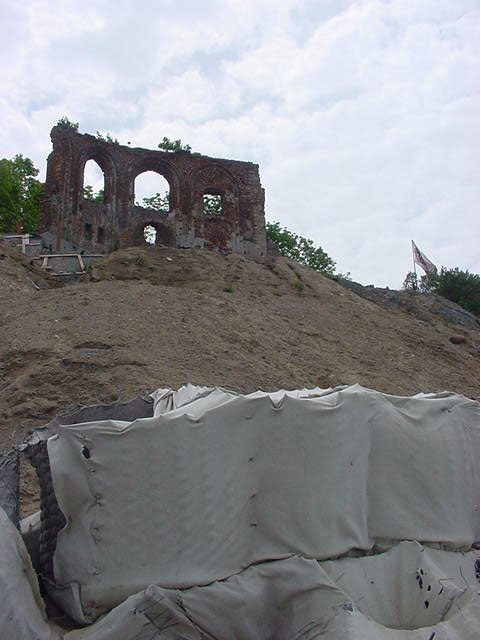

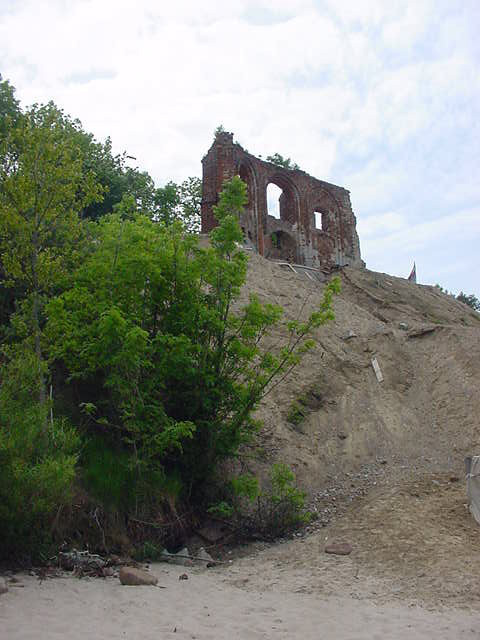

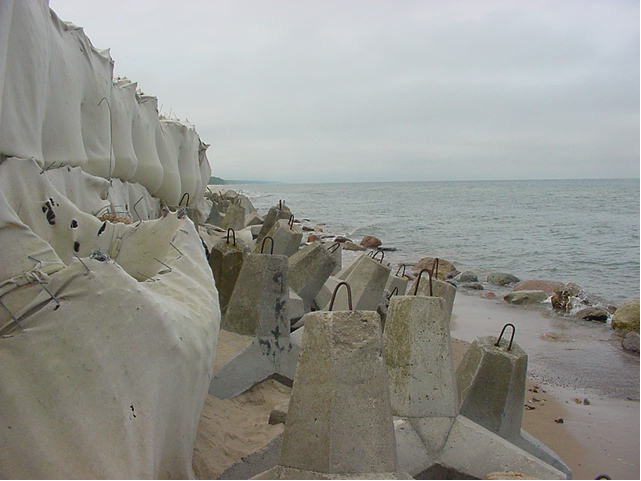

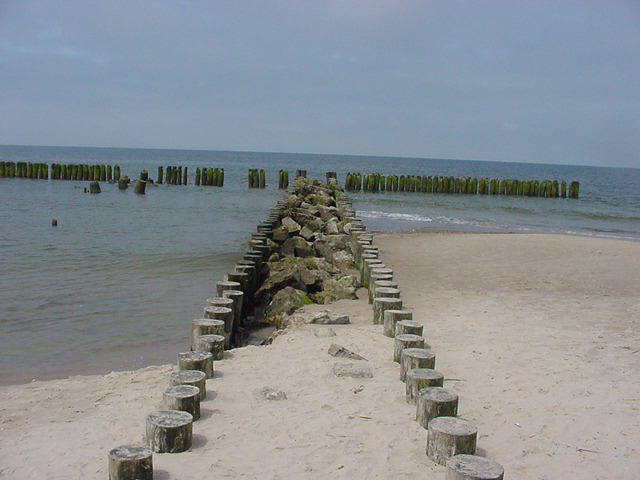

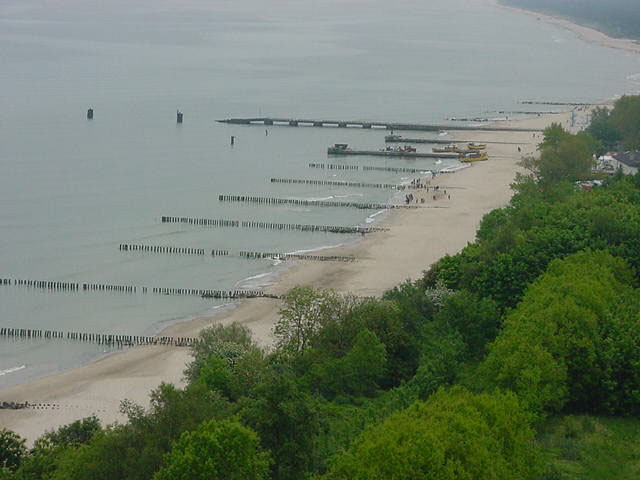

==== Portugal ====
The North Portuguese coast and its beaches were fed by large Iberian rivers. The massive building of dams in the Douro River basin has cut the sediment supply to the Aveiro coast, resulting in its recession. Hard protective works have been done all along.

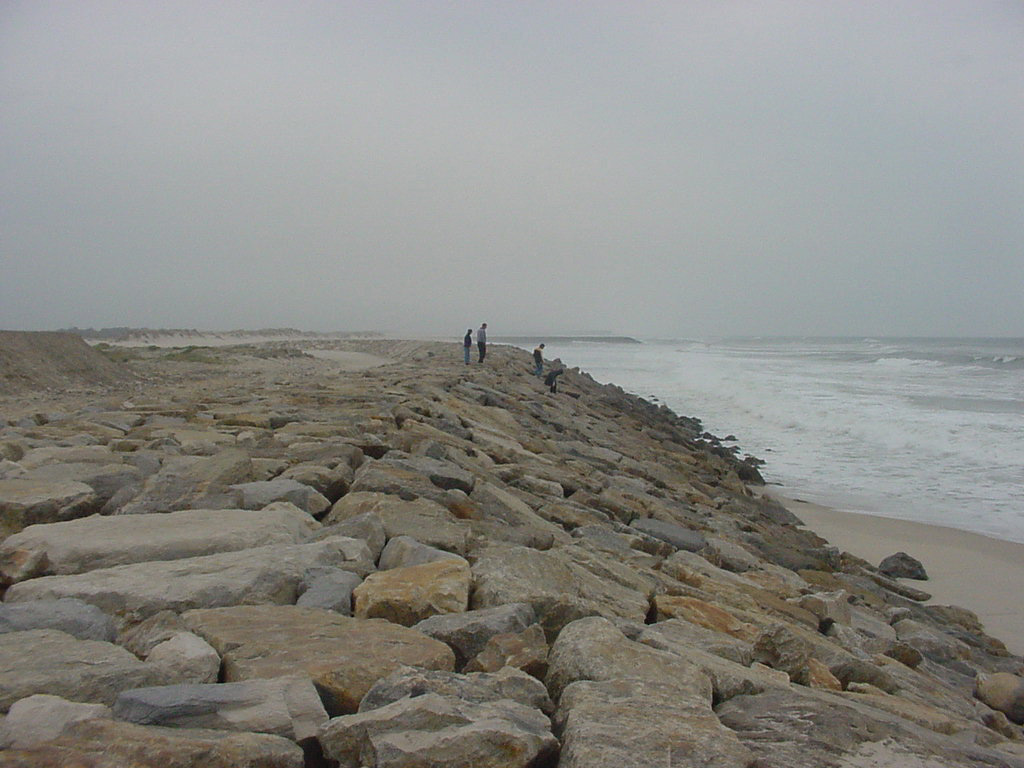

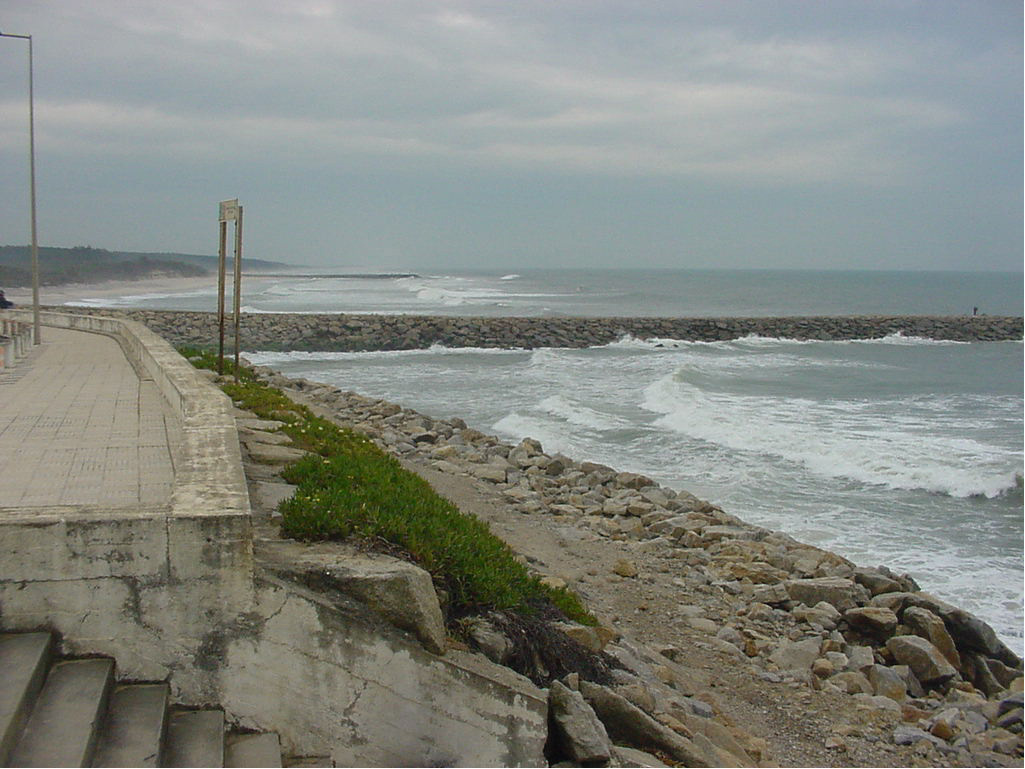

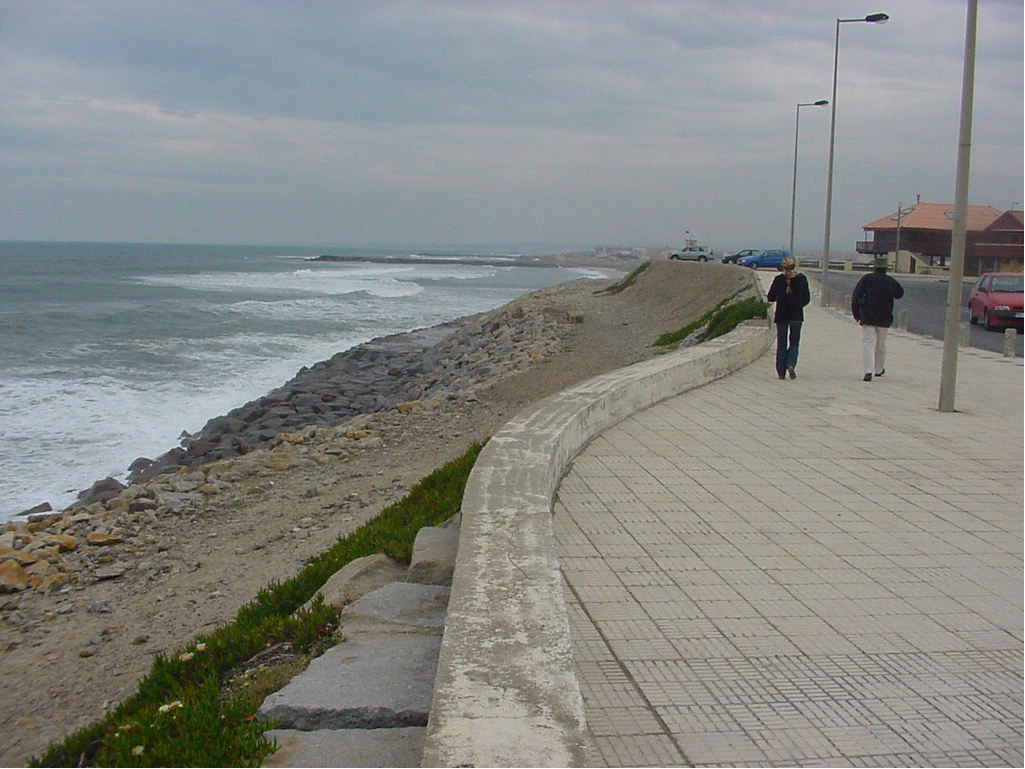

== See also ==
- Beach erosion and accretion
  - Beach nourishment
  - Modern recession of beaches
  - Paleoshoreline
  - Raised beach
  - Strand plain
- Integrated coastal zone management
  - Coastal management, to prevent coastal erosion and creation of beach
  - Coastal and oceanic landforms
  - Coastal development hazards
  - Coastal erosion
  - Coastal geography
  - Coastal engineering
  - Coastal morphodynamics
  - Coastal and Estuarine Research Federation (CERF)
- Erosion
  - Bioerosion
  - Blowhole
  - Natural arch
  - Wave-cut platform
- Longshore drift
  - Deposition (sediment)
  - Coastal sediment supply
  - Sand dune stabilization
  - Submersion
