= Cuspate foreland =

Geographical features found on coastlines and lakeshores

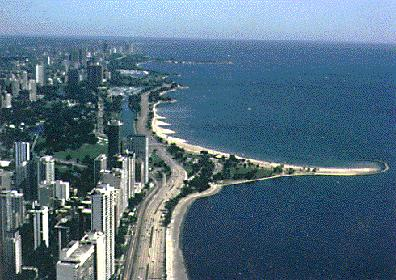
A cuspate foreland in Chicago, stabilised by vegetation

Cuspate forelands, also known as cuspate barriers or nesses in Britain, are geographical features found on coastlines and lakeshores that are created primarily by longshore drift. Formed by accretion and progradation of sand and shingle, they extend outwards from the shoreline in a triangular shape.

Some cuspate forelands may be stabilised by vegetation, while others may migrate down the shoreline. Because some cuspate forelands provide an important habitat for flora and fauna, effective management is required to reduce the impacts from both human activities and physical factors such as climate change and sea level rise.

== Formation ==
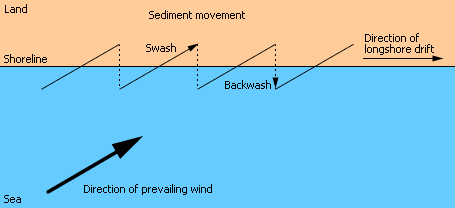
Longshore drift is usually the main process in the formation of a cuspate foreland

The debate involving how cuspate forelands form is ongoing. However, the most widely accepted process of formation involves long shore drift. Where longshore drift occurs in opposite directions, two spits merge into a triangular protrusion along a coastline or lakeshore. Their formation is also dependent on dominant and prevailing winds working in opposite directions. Formation can also occur when waves are diffracted around a barrier.

Cuspate forelands can form both along coastlines and along lakeshores. Those formed along coastlines can be in the lee of an offshore island, along a coastline that has no islands in the vicinity, or at a stream mouth where deposition occurs.

=== Formation in narrow straits or on open coastlines ===
A cuspate foreland can form in a strait or along a coastline that has no islands or shoals in the area. In this case, longshore drift as well as prevailing wind and waves bring sediment together from opposite directions. If there is a large angle between the waves and the shoreline, the sediment converges, accumulates, and forms beach ridges. Over time, a cuspate foreland forms as a result of continued accretion and progradation. An example of this type of cuspate foreland is the one found at Dungeness along the southern coast of Britain. This cuspate foreland has formed as a result of the merging of SW waves from the English Channel, and waves from the east from the Strait of Dover. Another example is the cuspate foreland found between Awatere River and White Bluffs in Marlborough, New Zealand. This foreland has ridges on the eastern and northern sides which face the prominent waves.

In other circumstances, spits are formed when long shore drift moves beach material down the beach until the coastline makes an abrupt change in direction, leading to the beach material 'spilling over' the corner to create a protrusion. This normally occurs across a river mouth. In the case of a cuspate foreland, the prevailing wind and a powerful secondary wind in the opposite direction move shingle down the coastline from both directions to a place where the coastline changes, causing a foreland to develop. The majority of cuspate forelands are formed over a coastline that juts out into the sea at enough of an angle to allow the drifting beach material to 'spill over' as a result of long shore drift in both directions.

=== Formation in the lee of an island ===
A cuspate foreland can form in the lee of an island. In this case, oncoming waves are diffracted around the island, protecting the coastline from the oncoming wave fronts. Sediments brought along the shoreline via longshore drift are then able to settle and accumulate in the lee of the island where there is less wave energy. This type of foreland has formed on the west shore of the North Island of New Zealand, in the lee of Kapiti Island. Waves refract around Kapiti Island, forming an area of low wave energy where sediment from the Waikanae River is able to settle. There is uncertainty whether the cuspate foreland has formed as a result of sediments coming from the north via longshore drift, or whether it has formed as a result of a complex cycle of sediments moving out to the continental shelf and then back again.

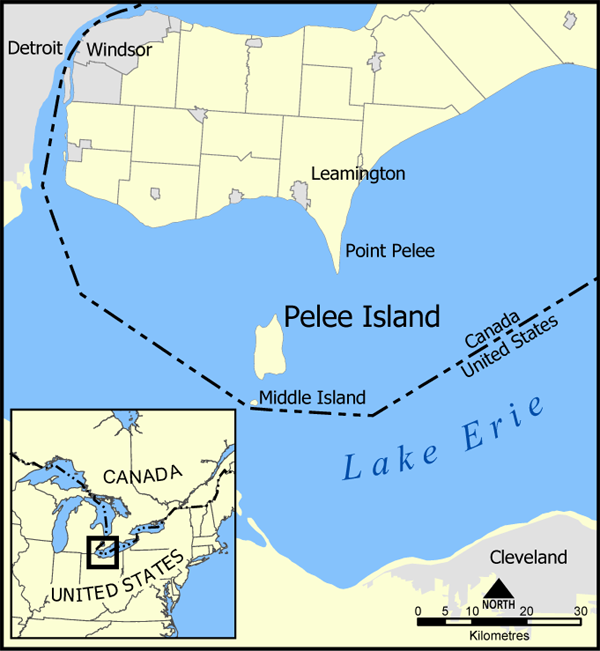
Point Pelee cuspate foreland location

=== Formation along lakeshores ===
As well as forming along coastlines, cuspate forelands can also form along lake shores, although less is known about this type of cuspate foreland. This type of cuspate foreland includes Point Pelee along the shoreline of Lake Erie, and those found along the shoreline of Lake Victoria in Australia. There are two theories with regard to the formation of Point Pelee. Firstly, it is thought that Point Pelee has formed from depositional processes. Alternatively, it is suggested that Point Pelee is a relic of a past feature that has eroded over time. This gap in knowledge provides the opportunity for further research. It is likely that Point Pelee is migrating westwards since accretion is occurring on the western side, and erosion is occurring on the eastern side. Lake Victoria in Australia also has a number of cuspate forelands. Point Scott is a cuspate foreland along this lakeshore that has formed from the gradual accumulation of sand and gravel.

== Features ==
Cuspate forelands can be separated into three distinct areas: the central nose or apex, and two marginal wings. The apex usually has ridges that run parallel to the converging shorelines. Cuspate forelands can extend up to 5 km from the shoreline, and an underwater shoal may extend much further, up to 15 km from the exposed apex. Located between the mainland and the foreland are often lagoons or marshy areas. In some areas, such as along the North Carolina coastline, a series of cuspate forelands may form at least 100 km apart. In areas that have a large amount of shingle, such as the cuspate foreland at Dungeness, it is also common for a fresh water table to be present.

== Movement ==
Once formed, cuspate forelands can remain where they are and continue to develop as sediment accumulates, or alternatively they may migrate down the coast as one side of the foreland erodes and the other side accretes. Cuspate Forelands that move are typical of those that are formed on open coastlines. The direction of migration is often indicated by a series of successive beach ridges on the advancing side of the foreland where there is less wave energy. The movement of cuspate forelands is commonly explained by longshore drift acting as the main process. However, there have been observed cases where two cuspate forelands on the same shoreline have migrated in opposite directions, showing that longshore drift does not always provide a sufficient explanation for their migration.

If there is an offshore sandbank present, the position of the cuspate foreland is usually related to its position. If there is a change in the position of the sandbank, the position of the cuspate foreland typically follows. Not only does the sandbank act like an island since it causes waves to refract around it, but it also provides a source of sediment. As sand erodes from the sandbank, it is pushed towards the coastline, contributing to the formation of the cuspate foreland as the sandbank migrates along the coast. This often occurs in the opposite direction to longshore drift.

In the case of a cuspate foreland that has formed close to an island, it is possible for it to extend right up to the island, forming a tombolo. Depending on the physical conditions such as storms, the feature can alternate between a cuspate foreland and a tombolo. Gabo Island in South Australia is an example of where this occurs.

== Succession ==
After the formation of the cuspate foreland into its distinctive triangular shape, it will start to be colonised by pioneer species that are hardy and tough enough to survive in the environment. These pioneer species secure the cuspate foreland and allow a greater amount of sediment to further secure it. Colonization and succession of vegetation is dependent on a number of factors. Firstly, if the shingle is too coarse, the amount of fine sediment that can remain between the spaces is reduced, and the likelihood that seeds will germinate and grow upwards is low. Seeds will also fail to germinate and grow if there is insufficient retention of fresh water. Stable cuspate forelands that are composed of shingle often have vegetation above the high tide line. As vegetation is established, mites and collembolans break down plant matter such as roots, resulting in the accumulation of organic matter. Plants also cause the soil to develop and water retention to increase, therefore providing a habitat where more plants can grow. Vegetation above the high tide line is common on cuspate forelands that are stable and composed of shingle.

== Biological habitat ==
Cuspate forelands provide a habitat for various flora and fauna. If a foreland is relatively stable and experiences low wave impact, it may be possible for vegetation to grow. In the United Kingdom, 11 taxa of invertebrates are found on shingle habitats. Shingle beaches also provide a habitat for birds to breed, nest, and rest en route while migrating.

== Impacts and management ==
There are different management issues with regard to cuspate forelands depending on their formation. If a cuspate foreland has formed from deposition, it may be vulnerable if human interference alters the transport of sediments from the shoreline. However, if the cuspate foreland is a relic of a past feature that has eroded, human interference with longshore sediment movement will not have a significant impact on the cuspate foreland. For a cuspate foreland to be maintained, the input of sediment must be greater than output of sediment. Activities such as coastal development or engineering must be regulated for sediment to continue moving towards the foreland where it can be deposited. Development along cuspate forelands is risky due to erosion and the vulnerability to storms and sea level rise. As sea levels rise, cuspate forelands are likely to be at risk as they could move inland.

At Point Pelee, approximately 1,900 hectares of former agricultural land on the cuspate foreland is now under water as a result of wind erosion and compaction of organic soils on the foreland. This foreland is particularly vulnerable to erosion when high lake levels are combined with spring and autumn cyclonic activity. Erosion can also occur as spring storms cause ice to scour the lake bottom at the edge of the foreland. Because there is uncertainty about its formation, there is uncertainty with regard to management, although Parks Canada realises the importance of including Point Pelee National Park in management plans.

When there is an aquifer present under a cuspate foreland, regulation of water removal is required. At Dungeness, water restrictions have been put in place to maintain the aquifer level.

The management of coastlines needs to take into account the natural processes that occur on cuspate forelands since many provide a habitat for birds. Alternative ways of managing coastal erosion is needed, such as the use of ‘soft’ defences instead of high impact defences such as sea walls. Some cuspate forelands naturally do not contain any vegetation due to a high level of disturbance from physical factors such as wave action. However, with the frequency of storms arising from climate change, the effect on forelands and their associated vegetation needs to be effectively managed.

== See also ==
- Integrated coastal zone management
- Beach evolution
- Longshore transport
- Point Pelee National Park
