= Coastal geography =

Study of the region between the ocean and the land

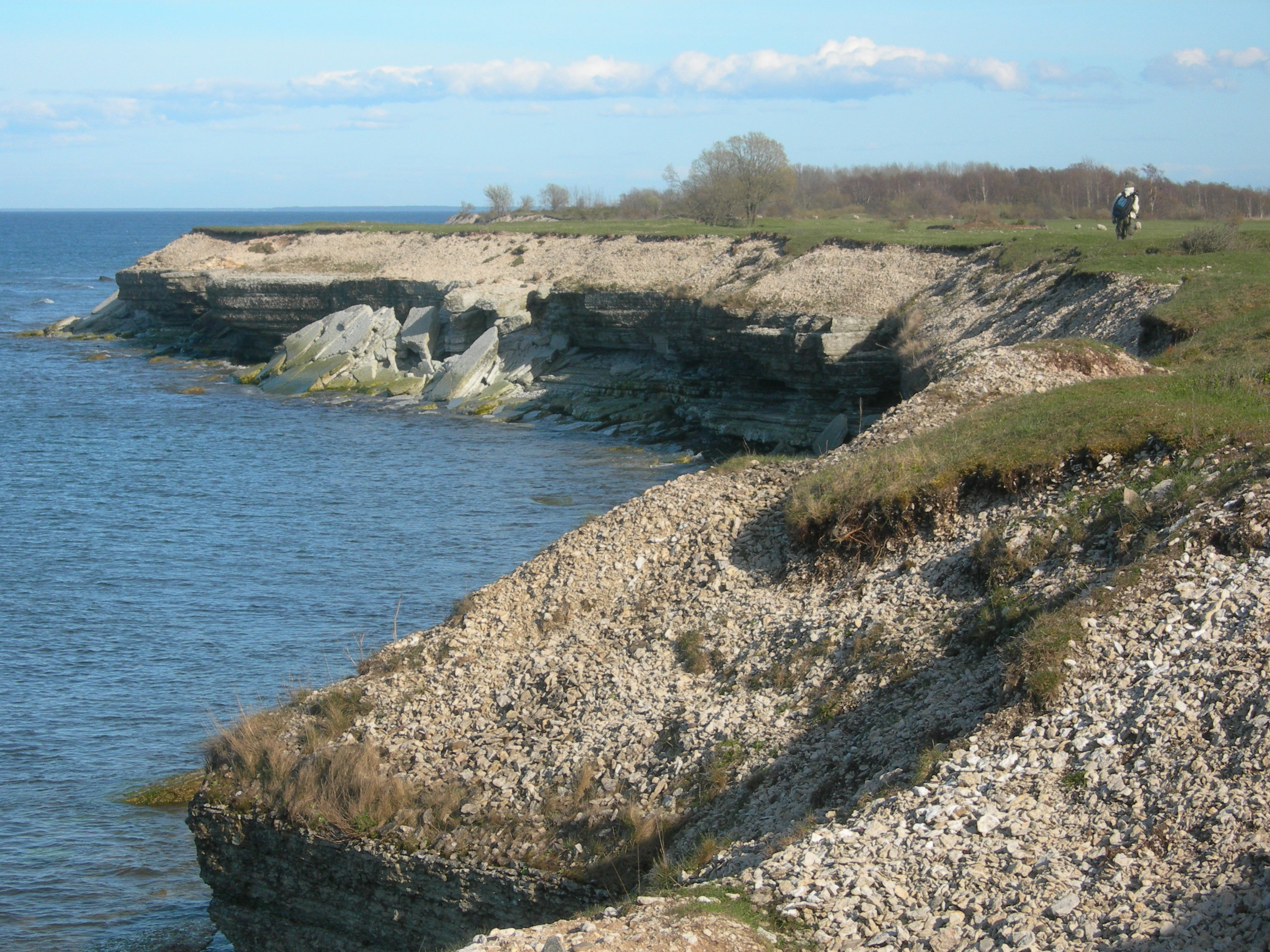
Collapsed Ordovician limestone bank showing coastal erosion. NW Osmussaar, Estonia.

Coastal geography is the study of the constantly changing region between the ocean and the land, incorporating both the physical geography (i.e. coastal geomorphology, climatology and oceanography) and the human geography (sociology and history) of the coast. It includes understanding coastal weathering processes, particularly wave action, sediment movement and weather, and the ways in which humans interact with the coast.

== Wave action and longshore drift ==
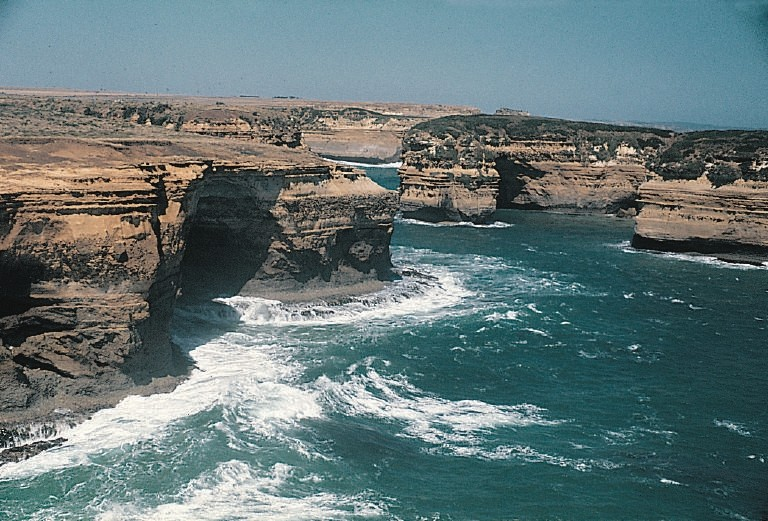
Port Campbell in southern Australia is a high-energy shoreline.

The waves of different strengths that constantly hit against the shoreline are the primary movers and shapers of the coastline. Despite the simplicity of this process, the differences between waves and the rocks they hit result in hugely varying shapes.

The effect that waves have depends on their strength. Strong waves, also called destructive waves, occur on high-energy beaches and are typical of winter. They reduce the quantity of sediment present on the beach by carrying it out to bars under the sea. Constructive, weak waves are typical of low-energy beaches and occur most during summer. They do the opposite to destructive waves and increase the size of the beach by piling sediment up onto the berm.

=== Wave refraction ===
One of the most important transport mechanisms results from wave refraction. Since waves rarely break onto a shore at right angles, the upward movement of water onto the beach (swash) occurs at an oblique angle. However, the return of water (backwash) is at right angles to the beach, resulting in the net movement of beach material laterally. This movement is known as beach drift (Figure 3). The endless cycle of swash and backwash and resulting beach drift can be observed on all beaches. This may differ between coasts.

=== Longshore drift ===
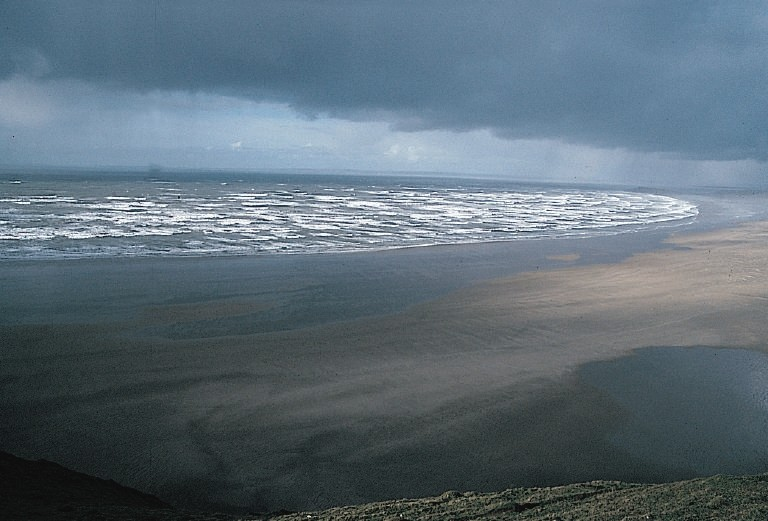
Rhossili in Wales is a low-energy shoreline.

Probably the most important effect is longshore drift (LSD), also known as Littoral Drift, the process by which sediment is continuously moved along beaches by wave action. LSD occurs because waves hit the shore at an angle, pick up sediment (sand) on the shore and carry it down the beach at an angle, which is called swash. Due to gravity, the water then falls back perpendicular to the beach, dropping its sediment as it loses energy, which is called backwash.

The sediment is then picked up by the next wave and pushed slightly further down the beach, resulting in a continual movement of sediment in one direction. This is the reason why long strips of coast are covered in sediment, not just the areas around river mouths, which are the main sources of beach sediment. LSD is reliant on a constant supply of sediment from rivers and if sediment supply is stopped or sediment falls into a submarine canals at any point along a beach, this can lead to bare beaches further along the shore.

LSD helps create many landforms including barrier islands, bay beaches and spits. In general LSD action serves to straighten the coast because the creation of barriers cuts off bays from the sea while sediment usually builds up in bays because the waves there are weaker (due to wave refraction), while sediment is carried away from the exposed headlands. The lack of sediment on headlands removes the protection of waves from them and makes them more vulnerable to weathering while the gathering of sediment in bays (where longshore drift is unable to remove it) protects the bays from further erosion and makes them pleasant recreational beaches.

== Atmospheric processes ==
- Onshore winds blowing "up" the beach, pick up sand and move it up the beach to form sand dunes.
- Rain hits the shore and erodes rocks, and carries weathered material to the shoreline to form beaches.
- Warm weather can encourage biological processes to occur more rapidly. In tropical areas some plants and animals protect stones from weathering, while other plants and animals actually eat away at the rocks.
- Temperatures that vary from below to above freezing point result in frost weathering, whereas weather more than a few degrees below freezing point creates sea ice.

== Biological processes ==
In tropical regions in particular, plants and animals not only affect the weathering of rocks but are a source of sediment themselves. The shells and skeletons of many organisms are of calcium carbonate and when this is broken down it forms sediment, limestone and clay.

== Physical processes ==
The main physical weathering process on beaches is salt-crystal growth. Wind carries salt spray onto rocks, where it is absorbed into small pores and cracks within the rocks. There the water evaporates and the salt crystallises, creating pressure and often breaking down the rock. In some beaches calcium carbonate is able to bind together other sediments to form beachrock and in warmer areas dunerock. Wind erosion is also a form of erosion. Dust and sand are carried around in the air and slowly erode the surface rock; this happens in a similar way in the sea, where the salt and sand are washed up onto the rocks.

== Sea level changes (eustatic change) ==
The sea level on earth regularly rises and falls due to climatic changes. During cold periods more of the Earth's water is stored as ice in glaciers while during warm periods it is released and sea levels rise to cover more land. Sea levels are currently quite high, while just 18,000 years ago during the Pleistocene ice age they were quite low. Global warming may result in further rises in the future, which presents a risk to coastal cities as most would be flooded by only small rises. As sea levels rise, fjords and rias form.

Fjords are flooded glacial valleys and rias are flooded river valleys. Fjords typically have steep rocky sides, while rias have dendritic drainage patterns typical of drainage zones. As tectonic plates move about the Earth, they can rise and fall due to changing pressures and the presence of glaciers.

== Land level changes (isostatic change) ==
If a beach is moving upwards relative to other plates, this is known as isostatic change, and raised beaches can be formed. This is found in the U.K. above the line from the Wash to the Severn estuary, where the land was covered in ice sheets during the last ice age. The weight of the ice caused northeast Scotland to sink, displacing the southeast and forcing it to rise. As the ice sheets receded the reverse process happened, as the land was released from the weight. At current estimates the southeast is sinking at a rate of about 2 mm per year, with northeast Scotland rising by the same amount.

== Coastal landforms ==
=== Spits ===
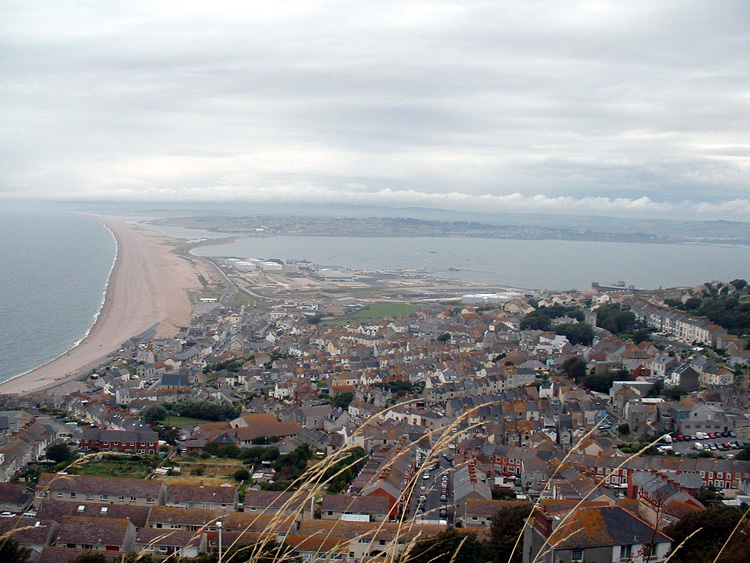
Chesil Beach, a tombolo in Dorset, United Kingdom.

If the coast suddenly changes direction, especially around an estuary, spits are likely to form. Long shore drift pushes the sediment along the beach but when it reaches a turn as in the diagram, the long shore drift does not always easily turn with it, especially near an estuary where the outward flow from a river may push sediment away from the coast. The area may also be shielded from wave action, preventing much long shore drift. On the side of the headland receiving weaker waves, shingle and other large sediments will build up under the water where waves are not strong enough to move them along. This provides a good place for smaller sediments to build up to sea level. The sediment, after passing the headland will accumulate on the other side and not continue down the beach, sheltered both by the headland and the shingle.

Slowly over time sediment simply builds on this area, extending the spit outwards, forming a barrier of sand. Once in a while, the wind direction will change and come from the other direction. During this period the sediment will be pushed along in the other direction. The spit will start to grow backwards, forming a 'hook'. After this process the spit will grow again in the original direction. Eventually the spit will not be able to grow any further because it is no longer sufficiently sheltered from erosion by waves, or because the estuary current prevents sediment resting. Usually in the salty, but calm waters behind the spit there will form a salt marshland. Spits often form around the breakwater of artificial harbours requiring dredging.

Occasionally, if there is no estuary then it is possible for the spit to grow across to the other side of the bay and form what is called a bar, or barrier. Barriers come in several varieties, but all form in a manner similar to spits. They usually enclose a bay to form a lagoon. They can join two headlands or join a headland to the mainland. When an island is joined to the mainland with a bar or barrier it is known as a tombolo. This usually occurs due to wave refraction, but can also be caused by isostatic change, a change in the level of the land (e.g. Chesil Beach).

== See also ==
- Beach erosion and accretion
  - Beach nourishment
  - Modern recession of beaches
  - Paleoshoreline
  - Raised beach
  - Strand plain
- Integrated coastal zone management
  - Coastal and oceanic landforms
  - Coastal development hazards
  - Coastal engineering
  - Coastal erosion
  - Coastal management, to prevent coastal erosion and creation of beach
- Concepts and Techniques in Modern Geography
  - Coastal and Estuarine Research Federation (CERF)
  - Coastal morphodynamics
  - Hard engineering
  - Human impacts on coasts
  - Natural hazard
  - Sea level rise
  - Soft engineering
- Erosion
  - Bioerosion
  - Blowhole
  - Natural arch
  - Wave-cut platform
- Longshore drift
  - Deposition (sediment)
  - Coastal sediment supply
  - Sand dune stabilization
  - Submersion
