= Strand plain =

Belt of sand along a shoreline

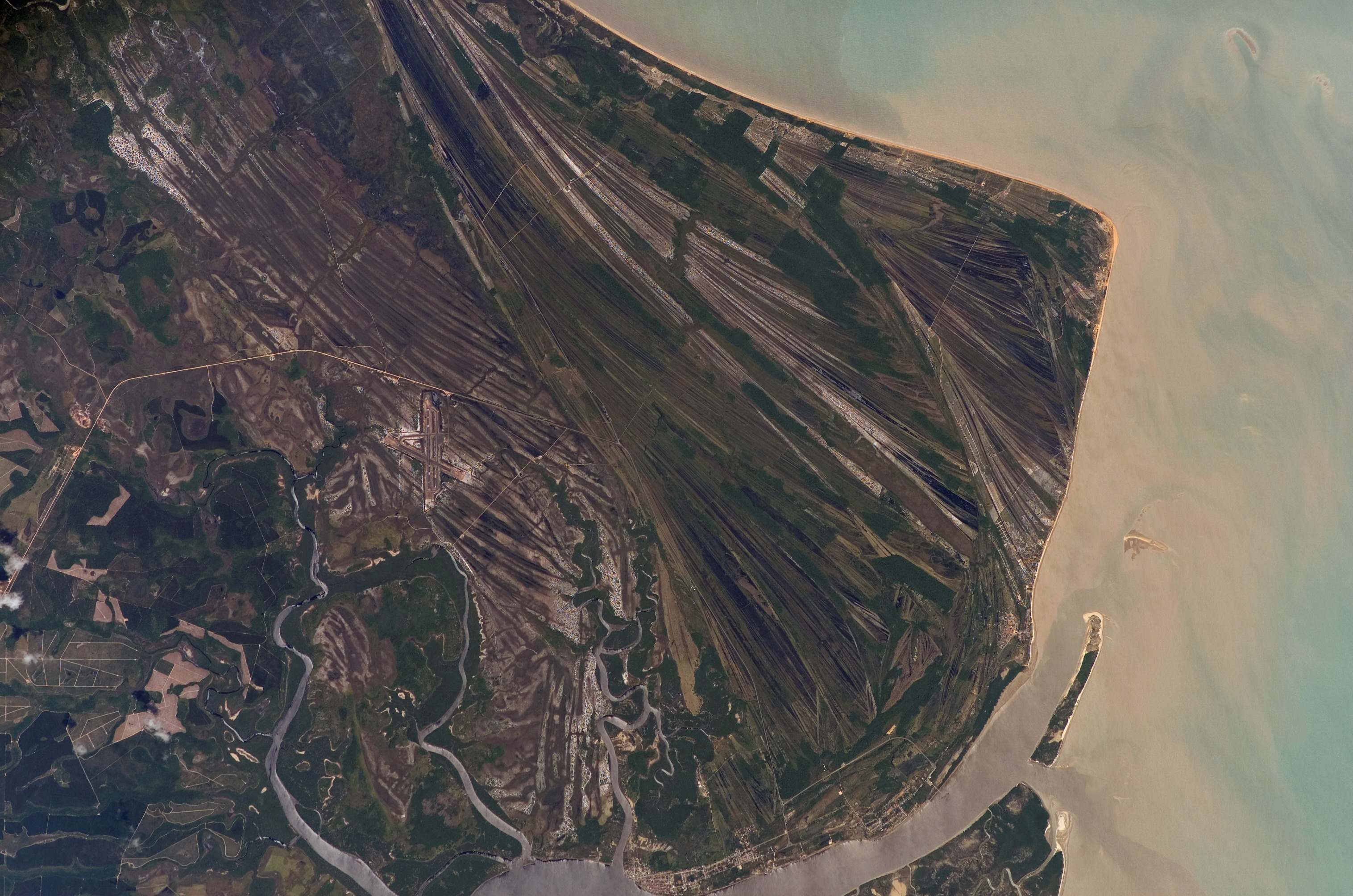
Caravelas strandplain, State of Bahia, Brazil.

Strand plain in Western Netherlands in 100 AD

A strand plain or strandplain is a broad belt of sand along a shoreline with a surface exhibiting well-defined parallel or semi-parallel sand ridges separated by shallow swales. A strand plain differs from a barrier island in that it lacks either the lagoons or tidal marshes that separate a barrier island from the shoreline to which the strand plain is directly attached. Also, the tidal channels and inlets which cut through barrier islands are absent. Strand plains typically are created by the redistribution by waves and longshore currents of coarse sediment on either side of a river mouth. Thus, they are part of one type of wave-dominated delta.

Examples of strand plains:

- Western Louisiana
- Eastern Texas
- West coast of Namibia
- South-east and south-west coasts of Australia, and in the Gulf of Carpentaria
- Letea and Caraorman, Danube Delta, Romania
- Kustvlakte, Suriname
- Cayo Costa, Florida

== See also ==
- Beach
- Beach evolution
- Chenier
- Coast
- River delta
