= Coastal erosion =

Displacement of land along the coastline

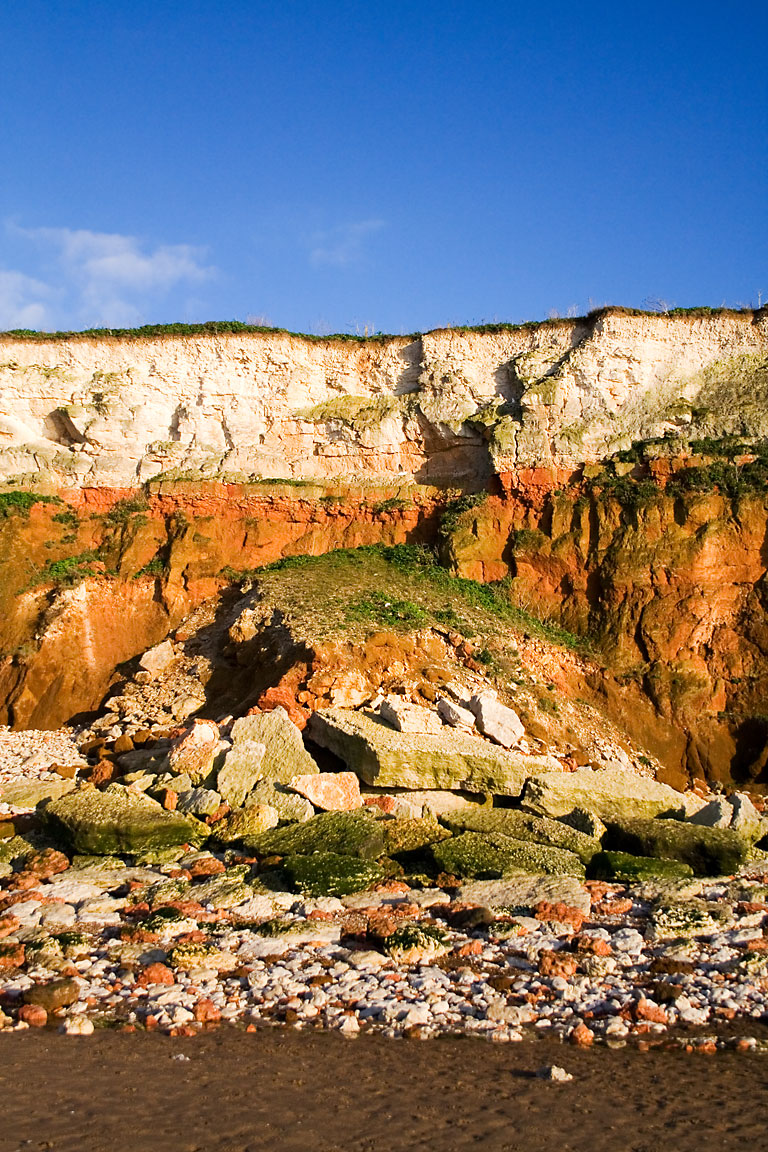
Heavy marine erosion: cliff fall at Hunstanton in the east of England

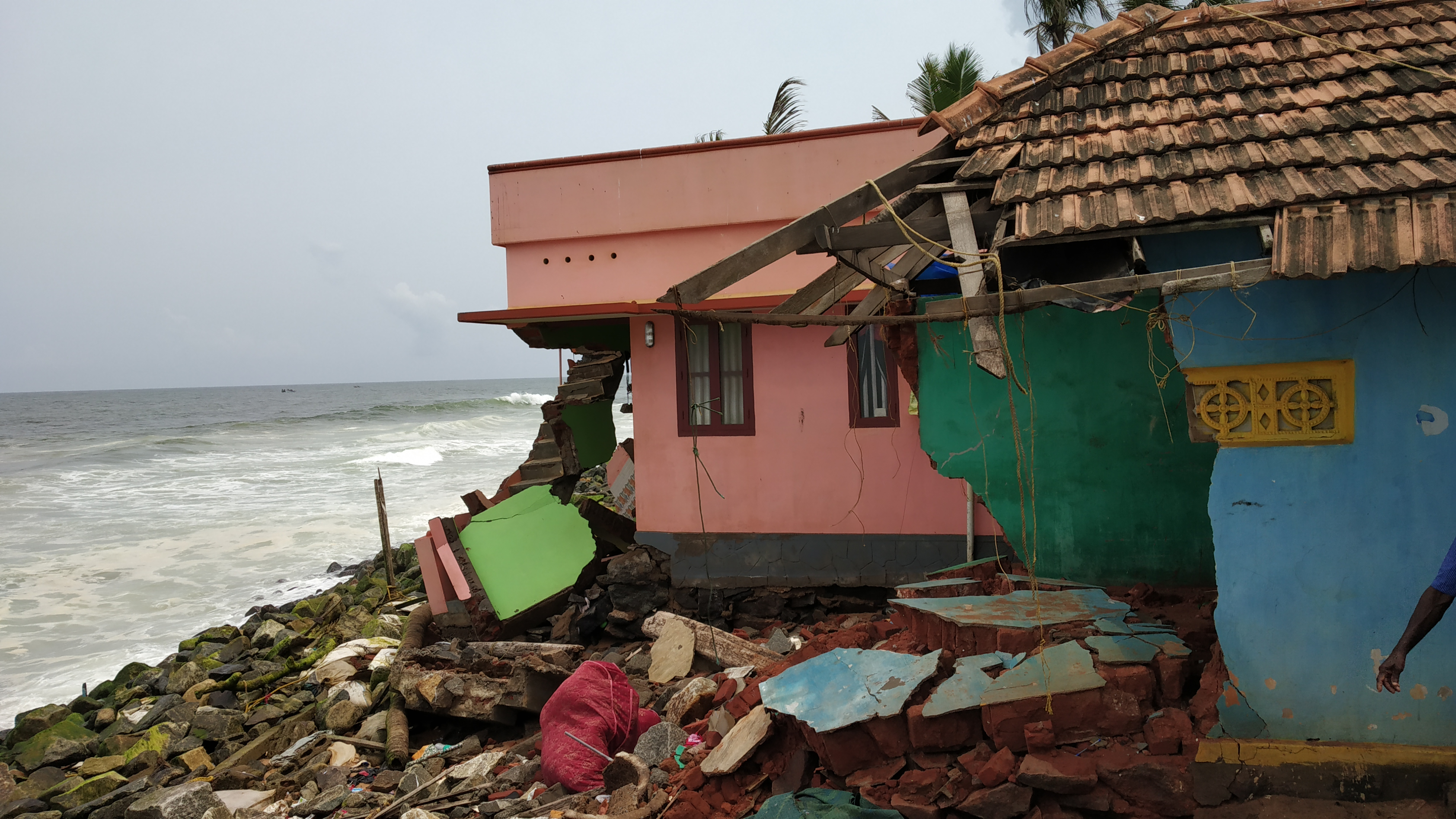
Sea erosion at Valiyathura Kerala, India

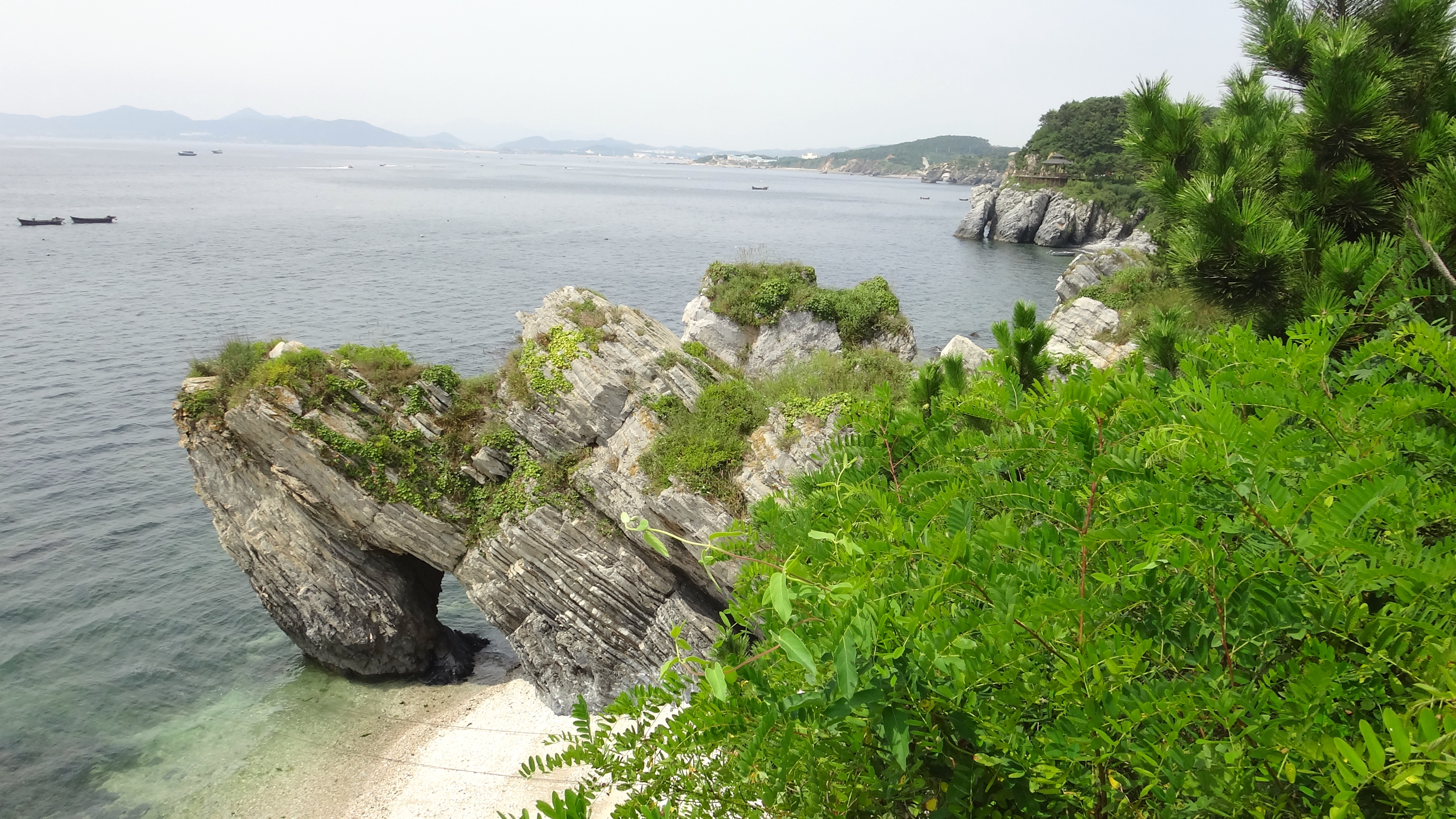
Tunnel-like structures formed by erosion in Jinshitan Coastal National Geopark, Dalian, Liaoning Province, China

Coastal erosion is the loss or displacement of land, or the long-term removal of sediment and rocks along the coastline due to the action of waves, currents, tides, wind-driven water, waterborne ice, or other impacts of storms. The landward retreat of the shoreline can be measured and described over a temporal scale of tides, seasons, and other short-term cyclic processes. Coastal erosion may be caused by hydraulic action, abrasion, impact and corrosion by wind and water, and other forces, natural or unnatural.

On non-rocky coasts, coastal erosion results in rock formations in areas where the coastline contains rock layers or fracture zones with varying resistance to erosion. Softer areas become eroded much faster than harder ones, which typically result in landforms such as tunnels, bridges, columns, and pillars. Over time the coast generally evens out. The softer areas fill up with sediment eroded from hard areas, and rock formations are eroded away. Also erosion commonly happens in areas where there are strong winds, loose sand, and soft rocks. The blowing of millions of sharp sand grains creates a sandblasting effect. This effect helps to erode, smooth and polish rocks. One type of erosion is grinding and wearing away of rock surfaces through the mechanical action of other rock or sand particles.

According to the IPCC, sea level rise caused by climate change will increase coastal erosion worldwide, significantly changing the coasts and low-lying coastal areas.

== Mechanisms ==
=== Hydraulic action ===
Hydraulic action occurs due to the physical weathering and mechanical response when waves strike a cliff face thus compressing air in cracks on the cliff face. This exerts pressure on the surrounding rock, and can progressively splinter and remove pieces. Over time, the cracks can grow, sometimes forming a cave. The splinters fall to the sea bed where they are subjected to further wave action.

=== Attrition ===
Attrition occurs when waves cause loose pieces of rock debris (scree) to collide with each other, grinding and chipping each other, progressively becoming smaller, smoother and rounder. Scree also collides with the base of the cliff face, chipping small pieces of rock from the cliff or have a corrasion (abrasion) effect, similar to sandpapering.

=== Solution ===
Solution is the process in which acids contained in sea water will dissolve some types of rock such as chalk or limestone.

=== Abrasion ===
Abrasion, also known as corrasion, occurs when waves break on cliff faces and slowly erode it. As the sea pounds cliff faces it also uses the scree from other wave actions to batter and break off pieces of rock from higher up the cliff face which can be used for this same wave action and attrition.

=== Corrosion ===
Corrosion or solution/chemical weathering occurs when the sea's pH (anything below pH 7.0) corrodes rocks on a cliff face. Limestone cliff faces, which have a moderately high pH, are particularly affected in this way. Wave action also increases the rate of reaction by removing the reacted material.

== Factors that influence erosion rates ==
=== Primary factors ===
Sea-dune Erosion at Talace beach, Wales

The ability of waves to cause erosion of the cliff face depends on many factors.

The hardness (or inversely, the erodibility) of sea-facing rocks is controlled by the rock strength and the presence of fissures, fractures, and beds of non-cohesive materials such as silt and fine sand.

The rate at which cliff fall debris is removed from the foreshore depends on the power of the waves crossing the beach. This energy must reach a critical level to remove material from the debris lobe. Debris lobes can be very persistent and can take many years to completely disappear.

Beaches dissipate wave energy on the foreshore and provide a measure of protection to the adjoining land.

The stability of the foreshore, or its resistance to lowering. Once stable, the foreshore should widen and become more effective at dissipating the wave energy, so that fewer and less powerful waves reach beyond it. The provision of updrift material coming onto the foreshore beneath the cliff helps to ensure a stable beach.

The adjacent bathymetry, or configuration of the seafloor, controls the wave energy arriving at the coast, and can have an important influence on the rate of cliff erosion. Shoals and bars offer protection from wave erosion by causing storm waves to break and dissipate their energy before reaching the shore. Given the dynamic nature of the seafloor, changes in the location of shoals and bars may cause the locus of beach or cliff erosion to change position along the shore.

Coastal erosion has been greatly affected by the rising sea levels globally. There has been great measures of increased coastal erosion on the Eastern seaboard of the United States and in areas of coastal Guyana. Locations such as Florida have noticed increased coastal erosion. In reaction to these increases Florida and its individual counties have increased budgets to replenish the eroded sands that attract visitors to Florida and help support its multibillion-dollar tourism industries.

Coastal erosion

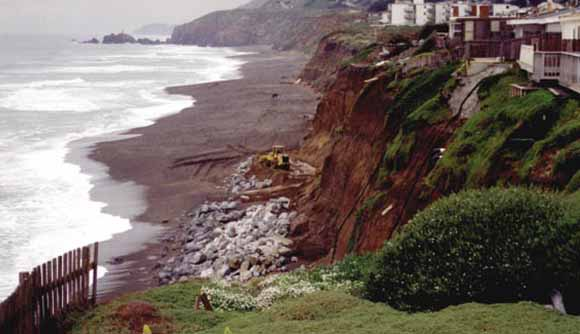
Pacifica, California coast after major storms in 1997 (resulting from the strongest El Niño on record) destroyed the houses shown above.

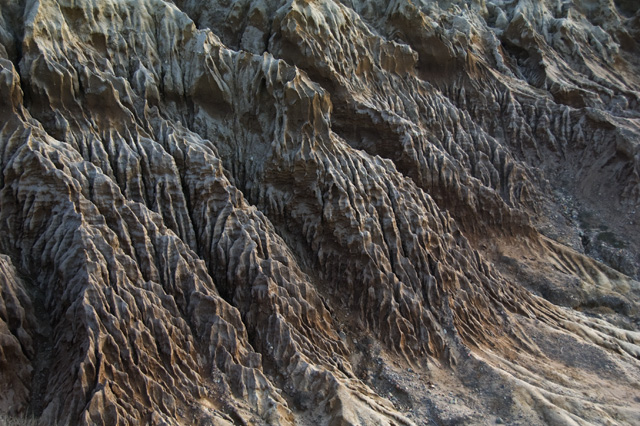
Beach erosion at Cabrillo National Monument, California.

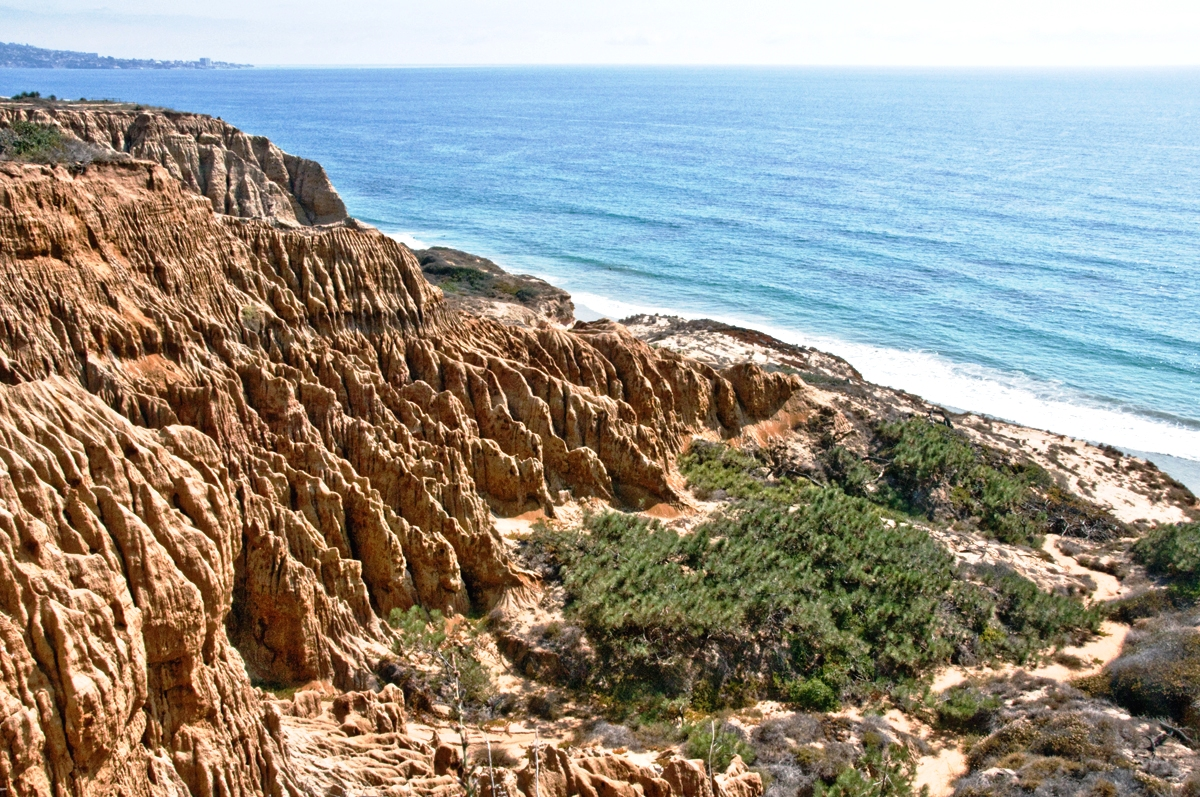
Large-scale coastal erosion at Torrey Pines State Natural Reserve, California.

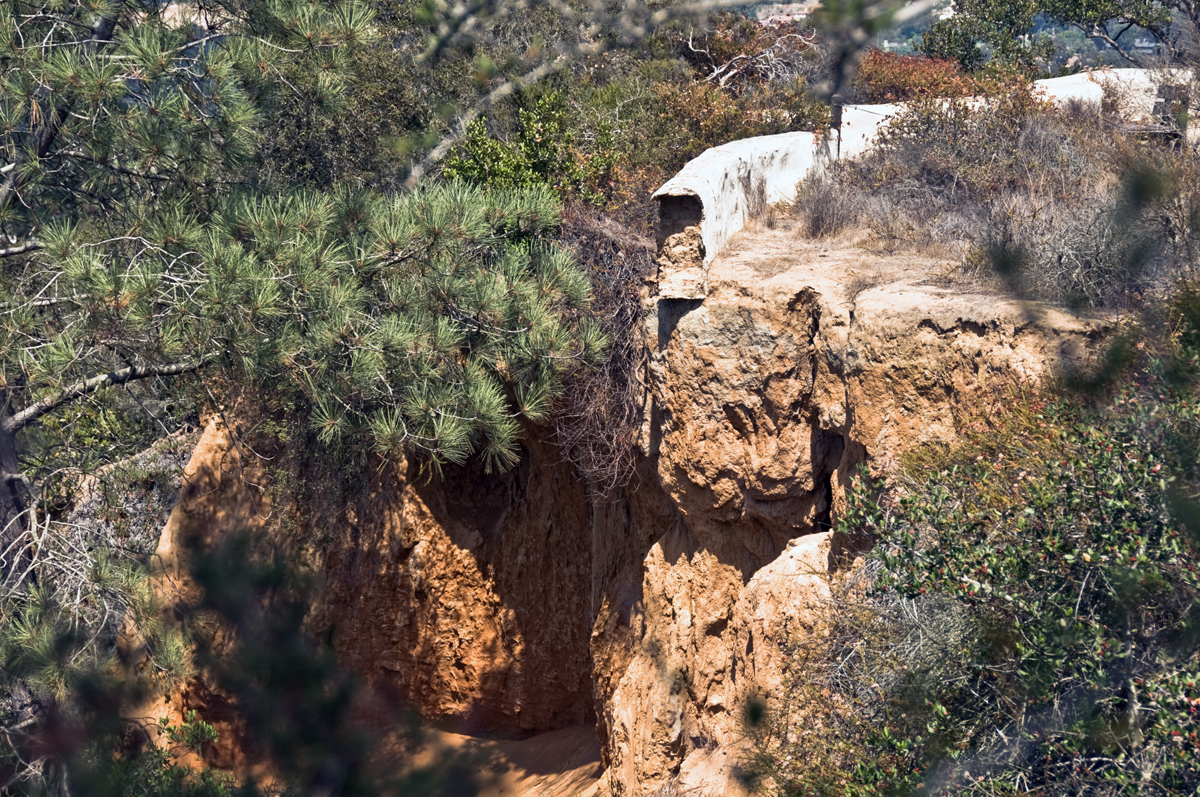
Coastal erosion at Torrey Pines State Natural Reserve, California, resulted in the necessary relocation of a scenic overlook.

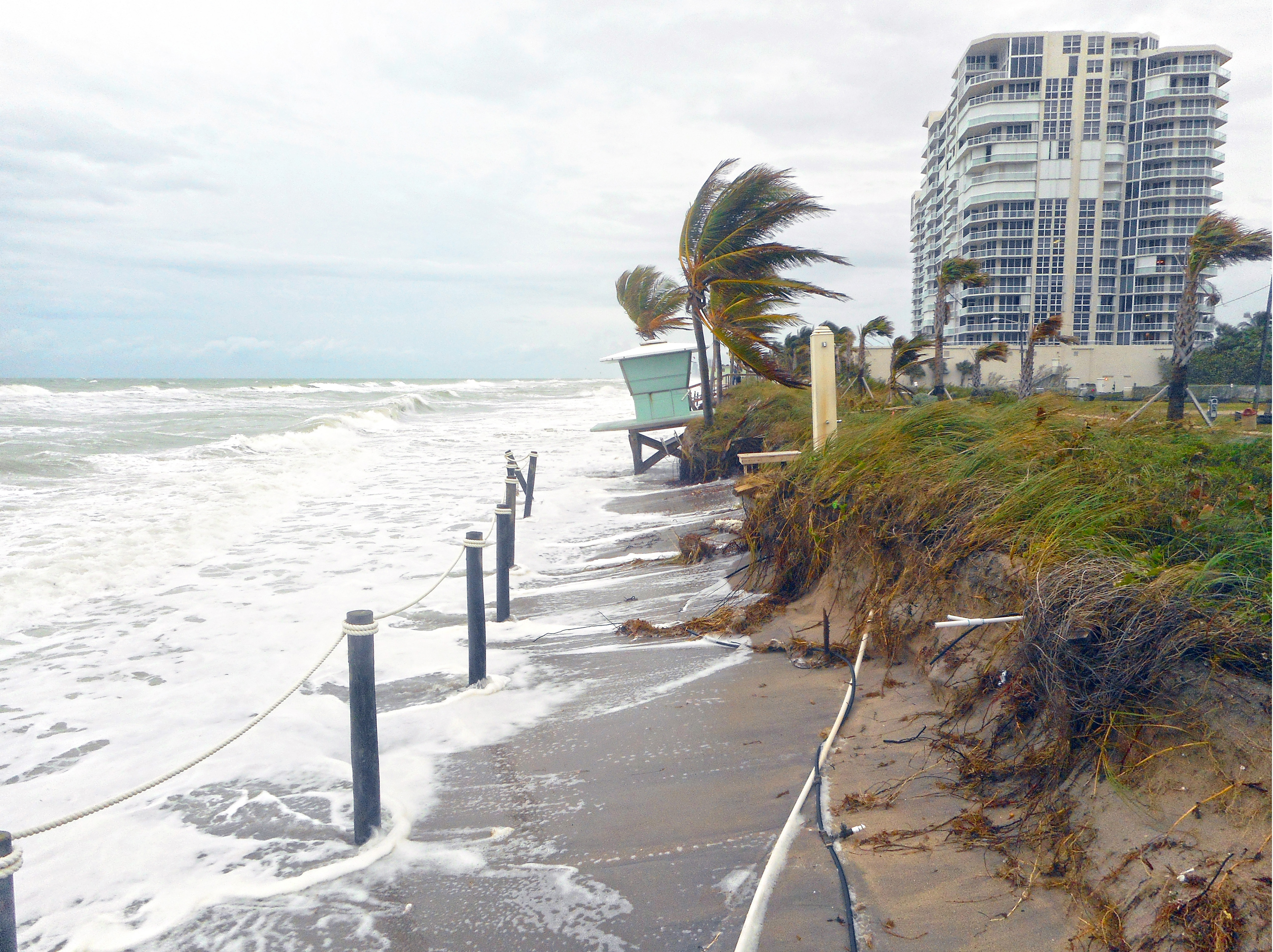
Coastal erosion during a king tide, Dania Beach, Florida

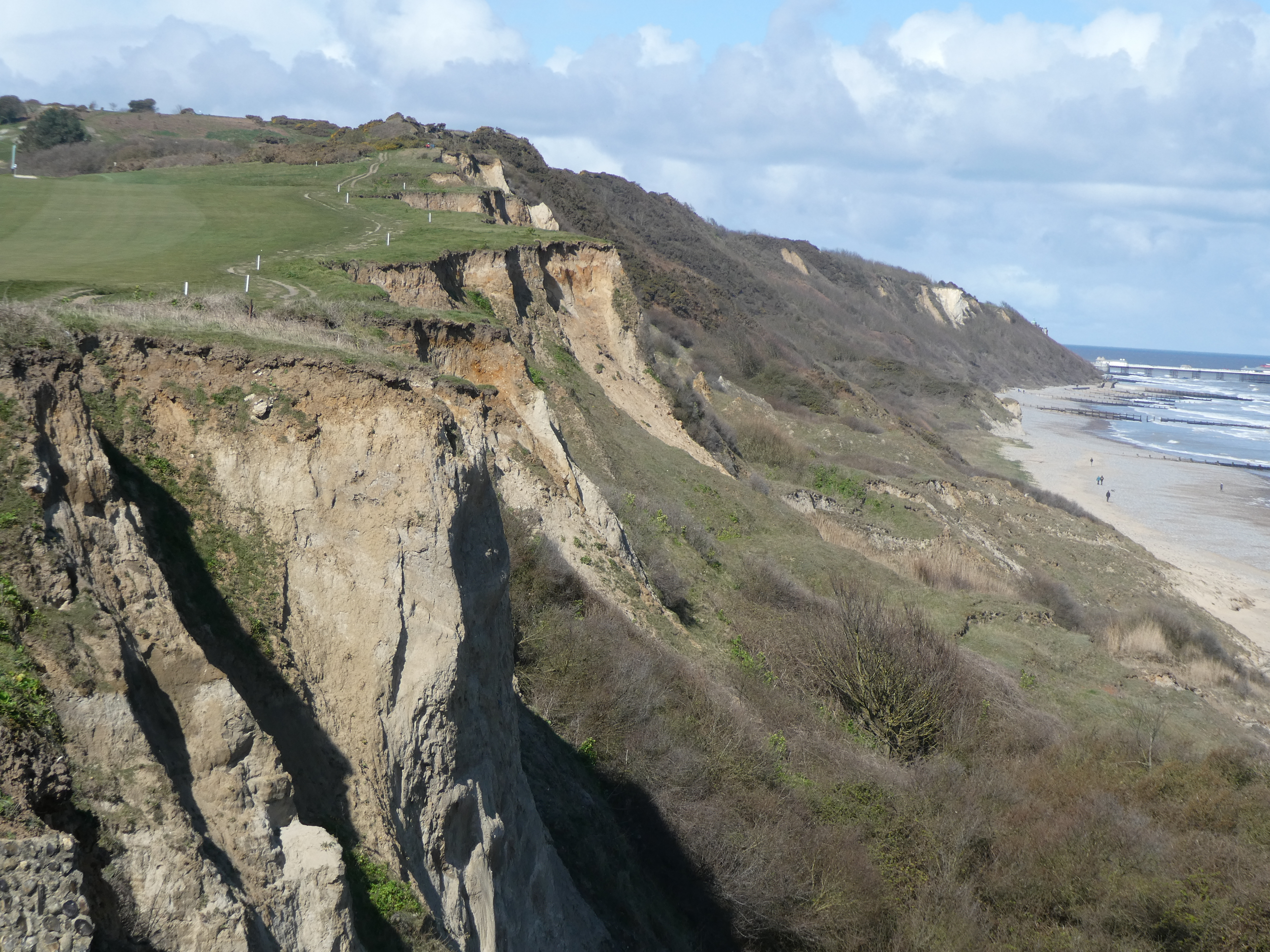
Erosion of cliffs on the Norfolk coast near Cromer. The coastline along East Anglia's North Sea coast is particularly prone to erosion, and has led to many instances of properties being relocated or destroyed over the course of history.

=== Secondary factors ===
- Weathering and transport slope processes
- Slope hydrology
- Vegetation
- Cliff foot erosion
- Cliff foot sediment accumulation
- Resistance of cliff foot sediment to attrition and transport
- Human Activities

=== Tertiary factors ===
- Resource extraction
- Coastal management

== Control methods ==
There are three common forms of coastal erosion control methods. These three include: soft-erosion controls, hard-erosion controls, and relocation.

=== Hard-erosion controls ===
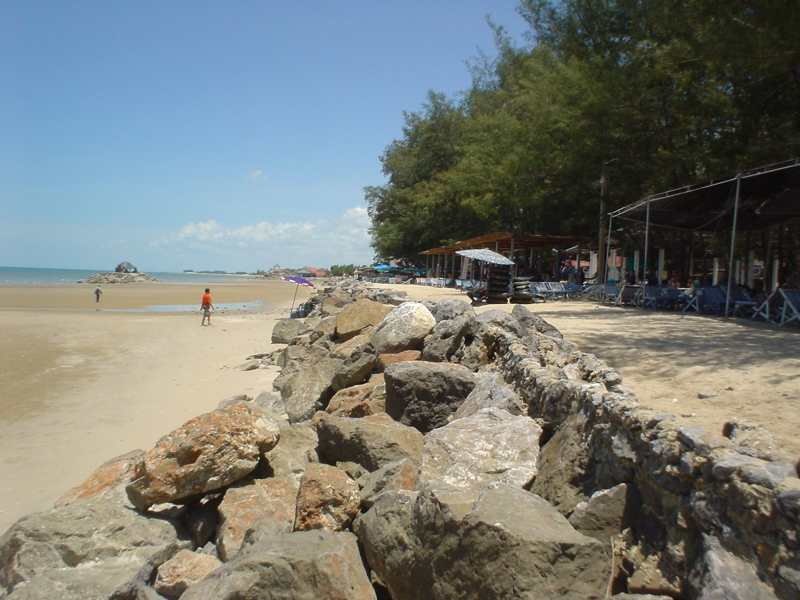
This image represents a typical seawall that is used for preventing and controlling coastal erosion.

Hard-erosion control methods provide a more permanent solution than soft-erosion control methods. Seawalls and groynes serve as semi-permanent infrastructure. These structures are not immune from normal wear-and-tear and will have to be refurbished or rebuilt. It is estimated the average life span of a seawall is 50–100 years and the average for a groyne is 30–40 years. Because of their relative permanence, it is assumed that these structures can be a final solution to erosion. Seawalls can also deprive public access to the beach and drastically alter the natural state of the beach. Groynes also drastically alter the natural state of the beach. Some claim that groynes could reduce the interval between beach nourishment projects though they are not seen as a solution to beach nourishment. Other criticisms of seawalls are that they can be expensive, difficult to maintain, and can sometimes cause further damage to the beach if built improperly. As we learn more about hard erosion controls it can be said for certain that these structural solutions cause more problems than they solve. They interfere with the natural water currents and prevent sand from shifting along coasts, along with the high costs to install and maintain them, their tendency to cause erosion in adjacent beaches and dunes, and the unintended diversion of stormwater and into other properties.

Natural forms of hard-erosion control include planting or maintaining native vegetation, such as mangrove forests and coral reefs.

=== Soft-erosion controls ===
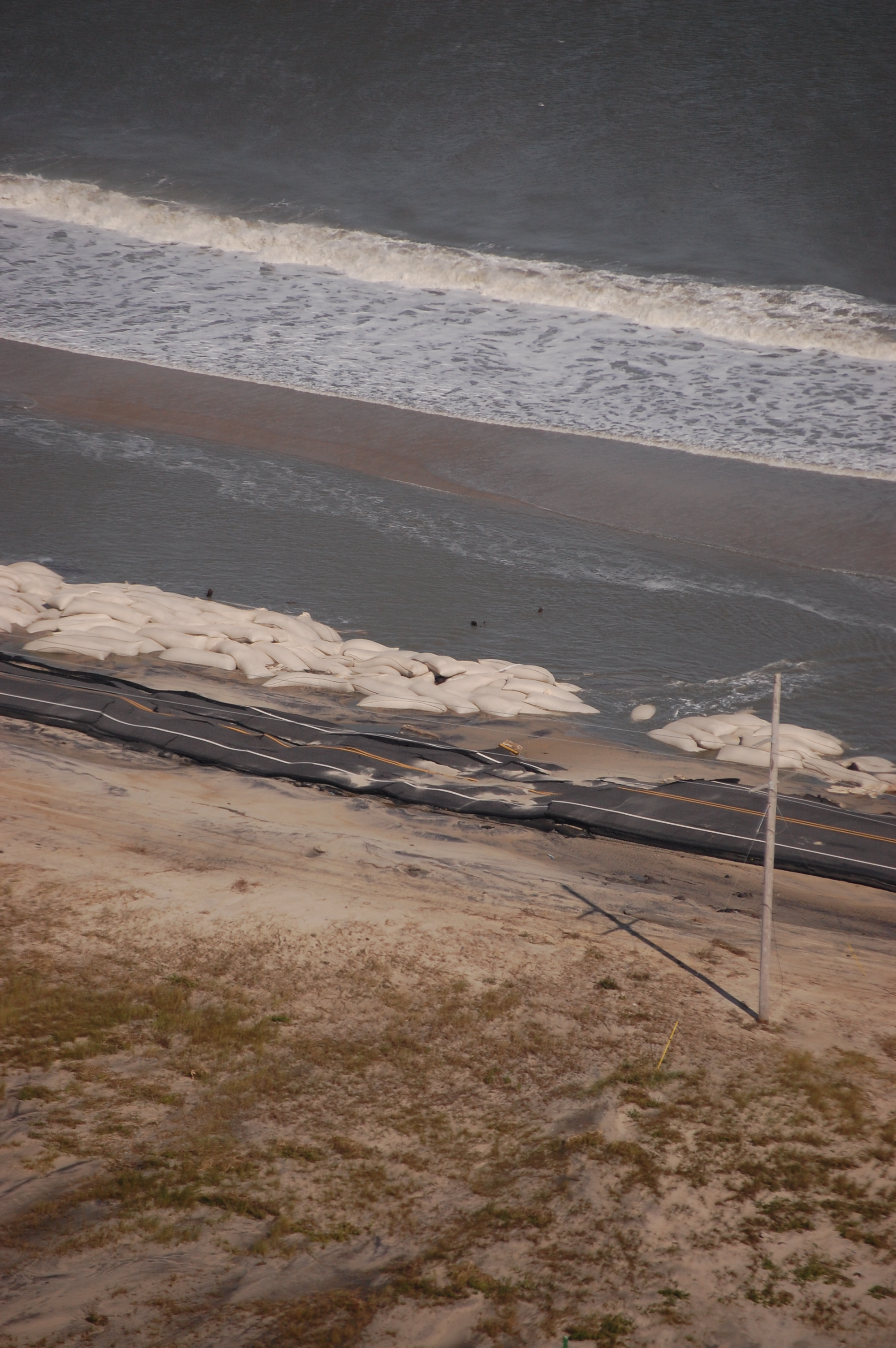
Sandbagged beach at the site of Hurricane Sandy.

Soft erosion strategies refer to temporary options of slowing the effects of erosion. These options, including Sandbag and beach nourishment, are not intended to be long-term solutions or permanent solutions. Another method, beach scraping or beach bulldozing allows for the creation of an artificial dune in front of a building or as means of preserving a building foundation. However, there is a U.S. federal moratorium on beach bulldozing during turtle nesting season, 1 May – 15 November. One of the most common methods of soft erosion control is beach nourishment projects. These projects involve dredging sand and moving it to the beaches as a means of reestablishing the sand lost due to erosion. In some situations, beach nourishment is not a suitable measure to take for erosion control, such as in areas with sand sinks or frequent and large storms. Dynamic revetment, which uses loose cobble to mimic the function of a natural storm beach, may be a soft-erosion control alternative in high energy environments such as open coastlines.

Over the years beach nourishment has become a very controversial shore protection measure: It has the potential to negatively impact several of the natural resources. Some large issues with these beach nourishment projects are that they must follow a wide range of complex laws and regulations, as well as the high expenses it takes to complete these projects. Just because sand is added to a beach does not mean it will stay there. Some communities will bring in large volumes of sand repeatedly only for it to be washed away with the next big storm. Despite these factors, beach nourishment is still used often in many communities. Lately, the U.S. Army Corps of Engineers emphasized the need to consider a whole new range of solutions to coastal erosion, not just structural solutions. Solutions that have potential include native vegetation, wetland protection and restoration, and relocation or removal of structures and debris.

=== Living shorelines ===
The solutions to coastal erosion that include vegetation are called "living shorelines". Living shorelines use plants and other natural elements. Living shorelines are found to be more resilient against storms, improve water quality, increase biodiversity, and provide fishery habitats. Marshes and oyster reefs are examples of vegetation that can be used for living shorelines; they act as natural barriers to waves. Fifteen feet of marsh can absorb fifty percent of the energy of incoming waves.

=== Relocation ===
Relocation of infrastructure any housing farther away from the coast is also an option. The natural processes of both absolute and relative sea level rise and erosion are considered in rebuilding. Depending on factors such as the severity of the erosion, as well as the natural landscape of the property, relocation could simply mean moving inland by a short distance or relocation can be to completely remove improvements from an area. A coproduction approach combined with managed retreat has been proposed as a solution that keeps in mind environmental justice. Typically, there has been low public support for "retreating". However, if a community does decide to relocate their buildings along the coast it is common that they will then turn the land into public open space or transfer it into land trusts in order to protect it. These relocation practices are very cost-efficient, can buffer storm surges, safeguard coastal homes and businesses, lower carbon and other pollutants, create nursery habitats for important fish species, restore open space and wildlife, and bring back the culture of these coastal communities.

== Tracking ==
Storms can cause erosion hundreds of times faster than normal weather. Before-and-after comparisons can be made using data gathered by manual surveying, laser altimeter, or a GPS unit mounted on an ATV. Remote sensing data such as Landsat scenes can be used for large scale and multi year assessments of coastal erosion. Moreover, geostatistical models can be applied to quantify erosion effects and the natural temporal and spatial evolution of tracked coastal profiles. The results can be used to determine the required temporal and spatial distances between the measured profiles for ecomic tracking.

== Impacts ==
Coastal erosion has a wide range of environmental, economic, and social impacts, especially in areas with increased storm activity and increasing sea levels. Coastal erosion is a global phenomenon affecting coastlines in North America, Europe, Asia, and Island nations, with particularly severe impacts in low-lying regions and delta systems. These environmental, economic, and social consequences have led to increased research and implementation of coastal management strategies to reduce erosion and protect vulnerable shorelines.

== Environmental impacts ==
Coastal erosion can degrade and erode coastal landforms, such as dunes, wetlands, beaches, and barrier islands, which serve as natural protective buffers against storm surges and wave energy. Habitat loss due to erosion reduces biodiversity and disrupts ecological processes along the coastline. The loss of these features reduces coastal resilience and disrupts the sediment transport systems and ecological habitats.

== Economic and infrastructure impacts ==
Coastline erosion can cause infrastructure damage, increased maintenance and protection costs, and loss of property and land. Coastal erosion also affects economic activities along the coast, such as tourism and fisheries, by reducing the beach width and altering the coastal environment.

== Social impacts ==
Coastal communities directly affected by erosion are at risk of displacement, have reduced access to coastal resources, and face increased exposure to natural hazards. In some regions, erosion has contributed to the need for relocation or changes in land-use planning to reduce long-term risk.

== Climate change and storm-related impacts ==
Climate change has contributed to coastal erosion in areas due to rising sea levels, increased storm frequency, and changes in wave patterns. Storm events, including hurricanes and severe coastal storms, can accelerate coastal erosion through increased wave activity, storm surges, and sediment displacement. These events can remove large amounts of sediment in short periods, weakening natural coastal defenses such as beaches and dunes and increasing vulnerability to future erosion. Research conducted by the U.S. Geological Survey has shown that storm-induced erosion increases the risk of infrastructure damage and decreases the natural protective capacities of beaches and dunes. Recent studies also indicate that rising sea levels have intensified erosion rates in some coastal regions, increasing long-term exposure to coastal hazards. Sea-level rise allows waves to reach further inland, accelerating shoreline retreat and increasing the vulnerability of coastal infrastructure and ecosystems. Studies of the U.S. Gulf Coast have documented historically unprecedented erosion rates linked to accelerated sea-level rise and sediment loss.

== Examples ==
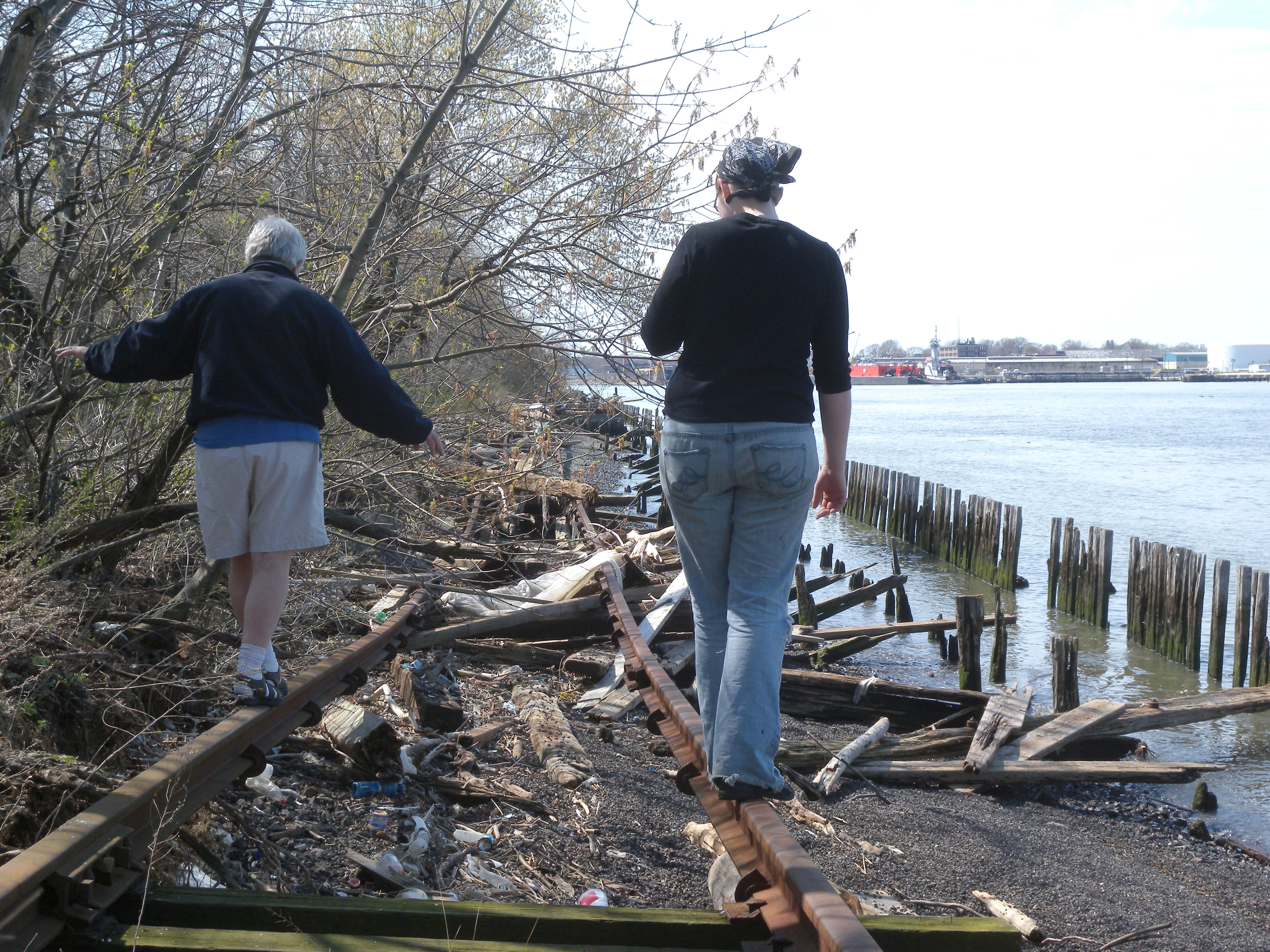
Small-scale erosion destroys abandoned railroad tracks

A place where erosion of a cliffed coast has occurred is at Wamberal in the Central Coast region of New South Wales where houses built on top of the cliffs began to collapse into the sea. This is due to waves causing erosion of the primarily sedimentary material on which the buildings foundations sit.

Dunwich, the capital of the English medieval wool trade, disappeared over the period of a few centuries due to redistribution of sediment by waves. Human interference can also increase coastal erosion: Hallsands in Devon, England, was a coastal village washed away over the course of a year, 1917, directly due to earlier dredging of shingle in the bay in front of it.

The California coast, which has soft cliffs of sedimentary rock and is heavily populated, regularly has incidents of house damage as cliffs erodes. Devil's Slide, Santa Barbara, the coast just north of Ensenada, and Malibu are regularly affected.

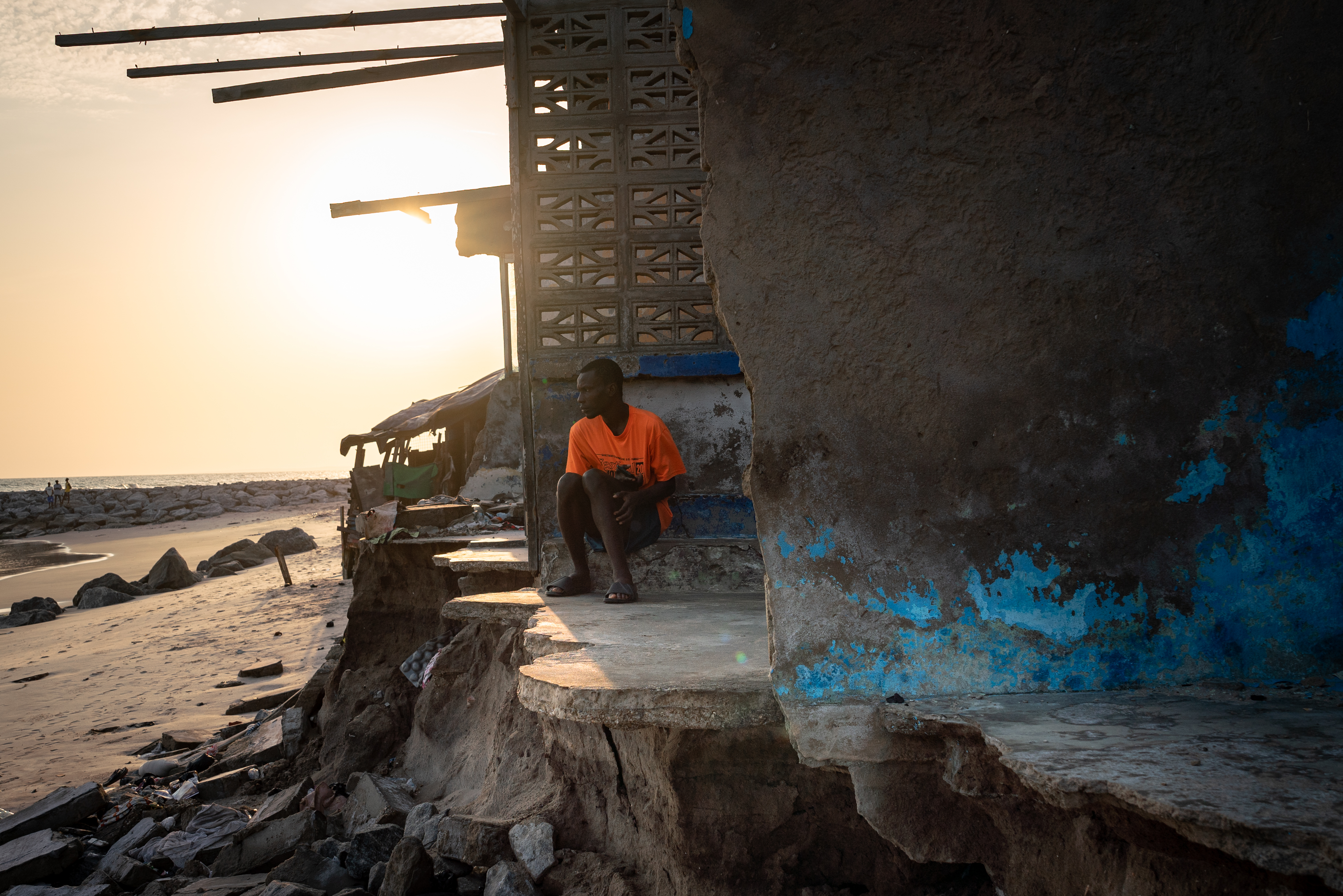
A man looking out over the beach from a building destroyed by high tides in Chorkor, a suburb of Accra. Sunny day flooding caused by sea level rise, increases coastal erosion that destroys housing, infrastructure and natural ecosystems. A number of communities in Coastal Ghana are already experiencing the changing tides.

The Holderness coastline on the east coast of England, just north of the Humber Estuary, is one of the fastest eroding coastlines in Europe due to its soft clay cliffs and powerful waves. Groynes and other artificial measures to keep it under control has only accelerated the process further down the coast, because longshore drift starves the beaches of sand, leaving them more exposed. The white cliffs of Dover have also been affected.

The coastline of North Cove, Washington has been eroding at a rate of over 100 feet per year, earning the area the nickname "Washaway Beach". Much of the original town has collapsed into the ocean. The area is said to be the fastest-eroding shore of the United States' West Coast. Measures were finally taken to slow the erosion, with substantial slowing of the process noted in 2018.

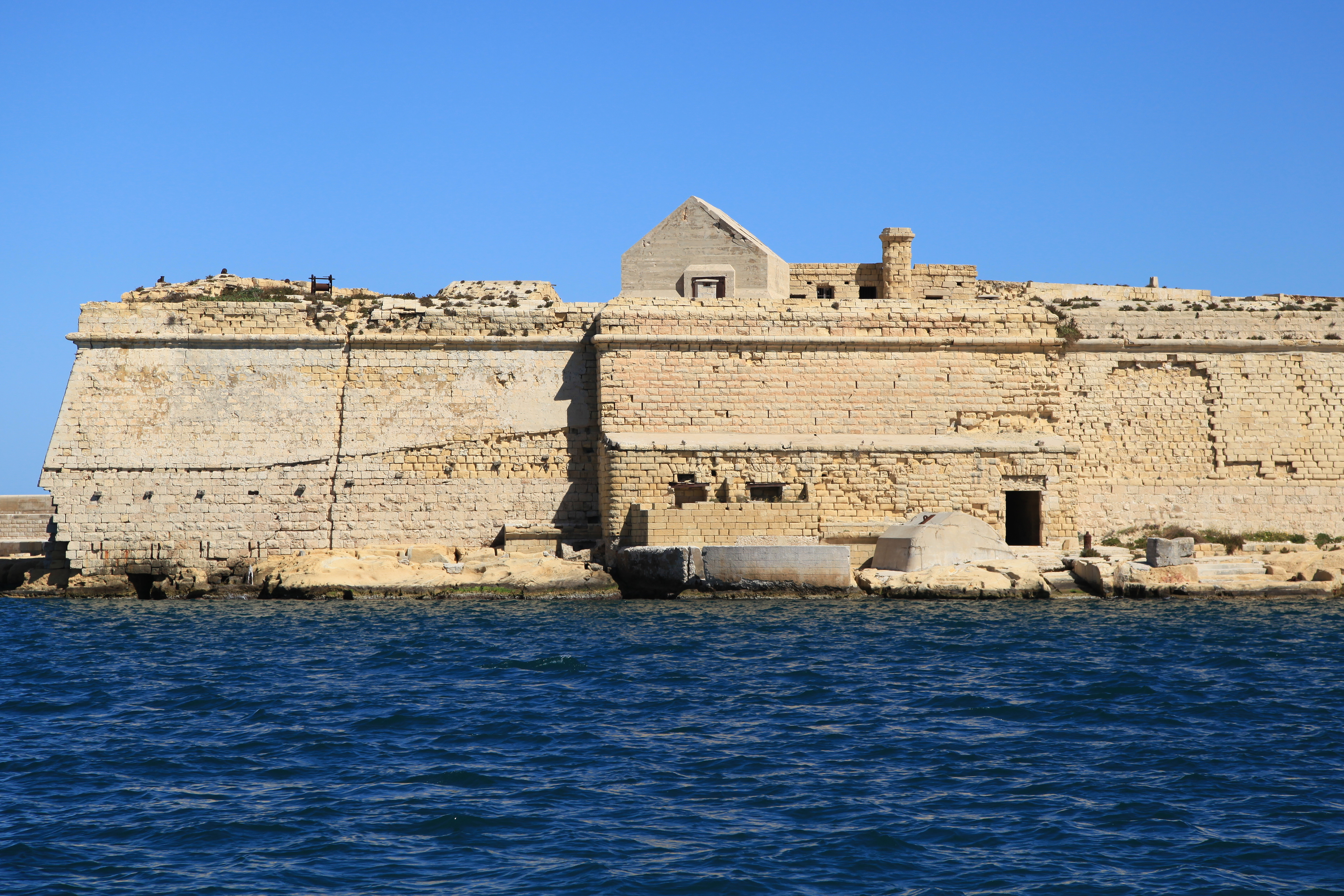
Fort Ricasoli in Kalkara, Malta already showing signs of damage where the land is being eroded

Fort Ricasoli, a historic 17th century fortress in Malta is being threatened by coastal erosion, as it was built on a fault in the headland which is prone to erosion. A small part of one of the bastion walls has already collapsed since the land under it has eroded, and there are cracks in other walls as well.

In El Campello, Spain, the erosion and failure of a Roman fish farm excavated from rock during the first century B.C. was exacerbated by the construction of a close sport harbour.

The Mediterranean coast of Spain has also experienced significant shoreline retreat driven by both natural dynamics and human pressure. A comprehensive analysis of the beaches of the Region of Murcia between 1956 and 2013 documented erosive trends across most coastal systems, with retreat concentrated particularly between San Pedro del Pinatar and Cabo de Palos, and between Cabo Tiñoso and the Andalusian border, driven by anthropogenic factors including land use changes in coastal watersheds and the construction of maritime infrastructure. The reduction of sediment supply from ephemeral channels ("ramblas") due to agricultural intensification has been identified as a key driver of this deficit. Coastal vulnerability assessments in the same region have further highlighted the exposure of low-lying urban beaches such as La Manga del Mar Menor to both erosion and projected sea level rise.

Hampton-on-Sea is suffering from this problem as well. Hampton-on-Sea is located in Kent, England. It was at one time very popular for its oyster fishing and was very reliant on the sea. Hampton-on-Sea has undergone the effects of coastal erosion since before the 1800s. Hampton-on-Sea's coastal erosion worsened with the increase in global warming and climate change. Global warming is causing a rise in sea level, more intense and frequent storms, and an increase in ocean temperature and precipitation levels. Another reason Hampton-on-Sea had such a horrific case of coastal erosion is due to an increase in the frequency and the intensity of storms it experienced. These natural events had destroyed the Hampton Pier, Hernecliffe Gardens, a set of villas, several roads, and many other structures that once lay on Hampton-On-Sea. After this destruction, in 1899 they started building a sea wall to protect the rest of the remaining land and buildings. However, the sea wall did not offer much help: buildings continued to be affected by the erosion. Then a storm came and broke the sea wall, it then flooded the land behind it. These events cause many land investors to back out. Eventually, Hampton-on-Sea had to be abandoned because the erosion overtook so much of the land. By 1916 Hampton-on-Sea had been completely abandoned. By the 1920s only a couple of structures still stood. It was at that point that Hampton-on-Sea was said to have been finally drowned. Today only three landmarks have survived the tragedy that Hampton-on-Sea had faced. These landmarks include The Hampton Inn, The Hampton Pier, and a few roads. Although The Hampton Pier is not the same size as the original it is still available for people to fish from.

A study published in Earth's Future, a journal by the American Geophysical Union in 2025 shows that coastal areas in arid regions, for example, in the Mediterranean, are severely affected by erosion. In 2025, for example, more than 7,000 buildings in the harbor city of Alexandria are at risk of collapsing due to erosion processes and groundwater changes.

In South America, the Chilean coast has experienced erosion on certain beaches due to an increased frequency in severe storms during warm phases of the El Niño-Southern Oscillation phenomenon.

== See also ==
- Beach erosion and accretion
  - Beach evolution
  - Beach morphodynamics
  - Beach nourishment
  - Raised beach
  - Modern recession of beaches
  - Paleoshoreline
- Integrated coastal zone management
  - Coastal management, to prevent coastal erosion and creation of beach
  - Coastal and oceanic landforms
  - Coastal development hazards
  - Coastal geography
  - Coastal engineering
  - Coastal and Estuarine Research Federation (CERF)
- Erosion
  - Bioerosion
  - Blowhole
  - Natural arch
  - Wave-cut platform
- Longshore drift
  - Deposition (sediment)
  - Coastal sediment supply
  - Sand dune stabilization
  - Submersion
