= Bratsch (disambiguation) =

Bratsch may refer to:

- Gampel-Bratsch, municipality in the district of Leuk in the canton of Valais in Switzerland
  - Bratsch, village in Gampel-Bratsch in the district of Leuk of the canton of Valais in Switzerland
- Bratsch (band), French-based music ensemble using various influences
- Czech version of the balkan tambura

== See also ==
- Bratsche, German for viola, from the Italian "viola da braccio"
- Bratschen, a German term, weathering products that occur as a result of frost and aeolian corrasion almost exclusively on the calc-schists of the Upper Slate Mantle (Obere Schieferhülle) in the High Tauern mountains of Austria
- Hinterer Bratschenkopf, mountain in the Glockner Group on the Fusch-Kaprun ridge (Fuscher / Kapruner Kamm) in the High Tauern, a high mountain range in the Austrian Central Alps
- Bratschenköpfe, two peaks in the Berchtesgaden Alps
