= Silt =

Classification of soil or sediment

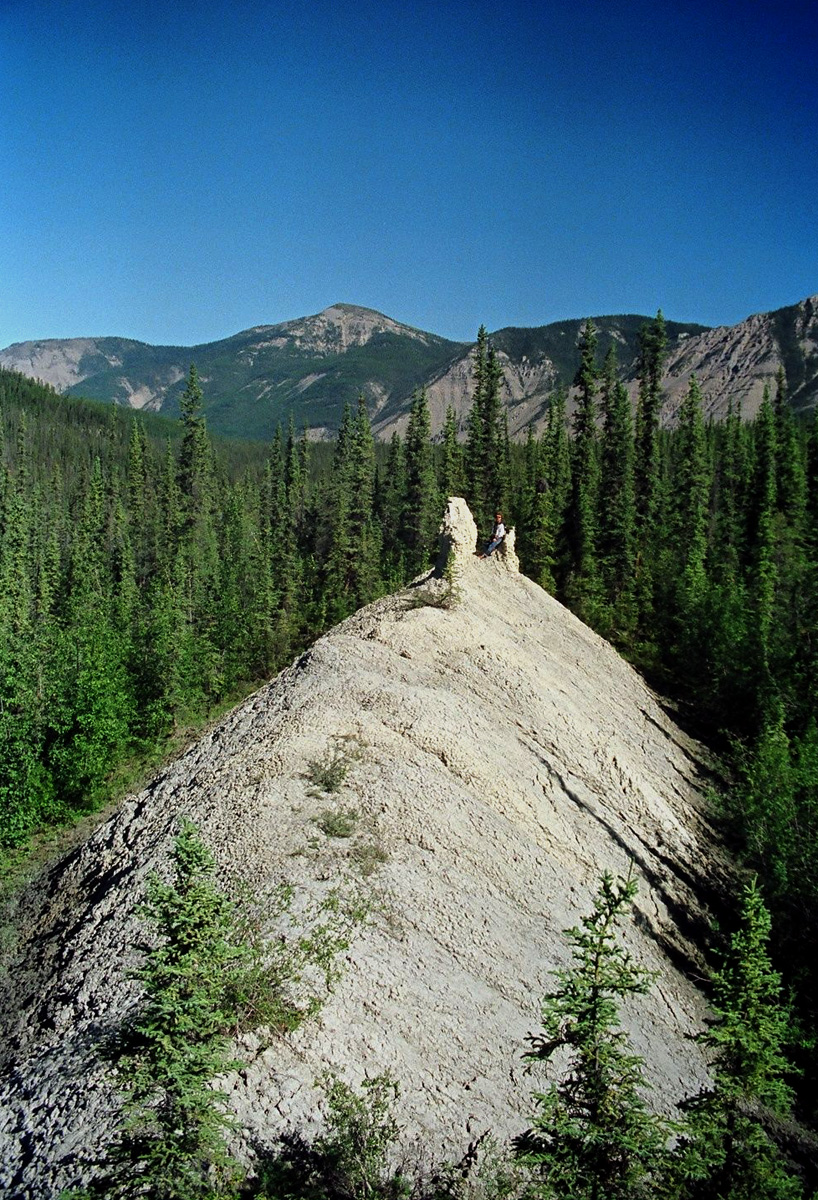
Windrow of windblown silt, Northwest Territories, Canada

Silt is granular material of a size between sand and clay and composed mostly of broken grains of quartz. Silt may occur as a soil (often mixed with sand or clay) or as sediment mixed in suspension with water. Silt usually has a floury feel when dry, and lacks plasticity when wet. Silt can also be felt by the tongue as granular when placed on the front teeth (even when mixed with clay particles).

Silt is a common material, making up 45% of average modern mud. It is found in many river deltas and as wind-deposited accumulations, particularly in central Asia, north China, and North America. It is produced in both very hot climates (through such processes as collisions of quartz grains in dust storms) and very cold climates (through such processes as glacial grinding of quartz grains.)

Loess is soil rich in silt, which makes up some of the most fertile agricultural land on Earth. However, silt is very vulnerable to erosion, and it has poor mechanical properties, making construction on silty soil problematic. The failure of the Teton Dam in 1976 has been attributed to the use of unsuitable loess in the dam core, and liquefication of silty soil is a significant earthquake hazard. Windblown and waterborne silt are significant forms of environmental pollution, often exacerbated by poor farming practices.

== Description ==
Silt is detritus (fragments of weathered and eroded rock) with properties intermediate between sand and clay. A more precise definition of silt used by geologists is that it is detrital particles with sizes between 1/256 and 1/16 mm (about 4 to 63 microns). This corresponds to particles between 8 and 4 phi units on the Krumbein phi scale. Other geologists define silt as detrital particles between 2 and 63 microns or 9 to 4 phi units. A third definition is that silt is fine-grained detrital material composed of quartz rather than clay minerals. Since most clay mineral particles are smaller than 2 microns, while most detrital particles between 2 and 63 microns in size are composed of broken quartz grains, there is good agreement between these definitions in practice.

The upper size limit of 1/16 mm or 63 microns corresponds to the smallest particles that can be discerned with the unaided eye. It also corresponds to a Tanner gap in the distribution of particle sizes in sediments: Particles between 120 and 30 microns in size are scarce in most sediments, suggesting that the distinction between sand and silt has physical significance. As noted above, the lower limit of 2 to 4 microns corresponds to the transition from particles that are predominantly broken quartz grains to particles that are predominantly clay mineral particles.

Assallay and coinvestigators further divide silt into three size ranges: C (2–5 microns), which represents post-glacial clays and desert dust; D1 (20–30 microns) representing "traditional" loess; and D2 (60 microns) representing the very coarse North African loess.

Silt can be distinguished from clay in the field by its lack of plasticity or cohesiveness and by its grain size. Silt grains are large enough to give silt a gritty feel, particularly if a sample is placed between the teeth. Clay-size particles feel smooth between the teeth. The proportions of coarse and fine silt in a sediment sample are determined more precisely in the laboratory using the pipette method, which is based on settling rate via Stokes' law and gives the particle size distribution accordingly. The mineral composition of silt particles can be determined with a petrographic microscope for grain sizes as low as 10 microns.

Vadose silt is silt-sized calcite crystals found in pore spaces and vugs in limestone. This is emplaced as sediment is carried through the vadose zone to be deposited in pore space.

=== Definitions ===
ASTM American Standard of Testing Materials: 200 sieve – 0.005 mm.

USDA United States Department of Agriculture 0.05–0.002 mm.

ISSS International Society of Soil Science 0.02–0.002 mm.

Civil engineers in the United States define silt as material made of particles that pass a number 200 sieve (0.074 mm or less) but show little plasticity when wet and little cohesion when air-dried. The International Society of Soil Science (ISSS) defines silt as soil containing 80% or more of particles between 0.002 mm to 0.02 mm in size while the U.S. Department of Agriculture puts the cutoff at 0.05mm. The term silt is also used informally for material containing much sand and clay as well as silt-sized particles, or for mud suspended in water.

== Occurrence ==
Silt is a very common material, and it has been estimated that there are a billion trillion trillion (10^{33}) silt grains worldwide. Silt is abundant in eolian and alluvial deposits, including river deltas, such as the Nile and Niger River deltas. Bangladesh is largely underlain by silt deposits of the Ganges delta. Silt is also abundant in northern China, central Asia, and North America. However, silt is relatively uncommon in the tropical regions of the world.

Silt is commonly found in suspension in river water, and it makes up over 0.2% of river sand. It is abundant in the matrix between the larger sand grains of graywackes. Modern mud has an average silt content of 45%. Silt is often found in mudrock as thin laminae, as clumps, or dispersed throughout the rock. Laminae suggest deposition in a weak current that winnows the silt of clay, while clumps suggest an origin as fecal pellets. Where silt is dispersed throughout the mudrock, it likely was deposited by rapid processes, such as flocculation. Sedimentary rock composed mainly of silt is known as siltstone.

Silt is common throughout the geologic record, but it seems to be particularly common in Quaternary formations. This may be because deposition of silt is favored by the glaciation and arctic conditions characteristic of the Quaternary. Silt is sometimes known as rock flour or glacier meal, especially when produced by glacial action. Silt suspended in water draining from glaciers is sometimes known as rock milk or moonmilk.

== Sources ==
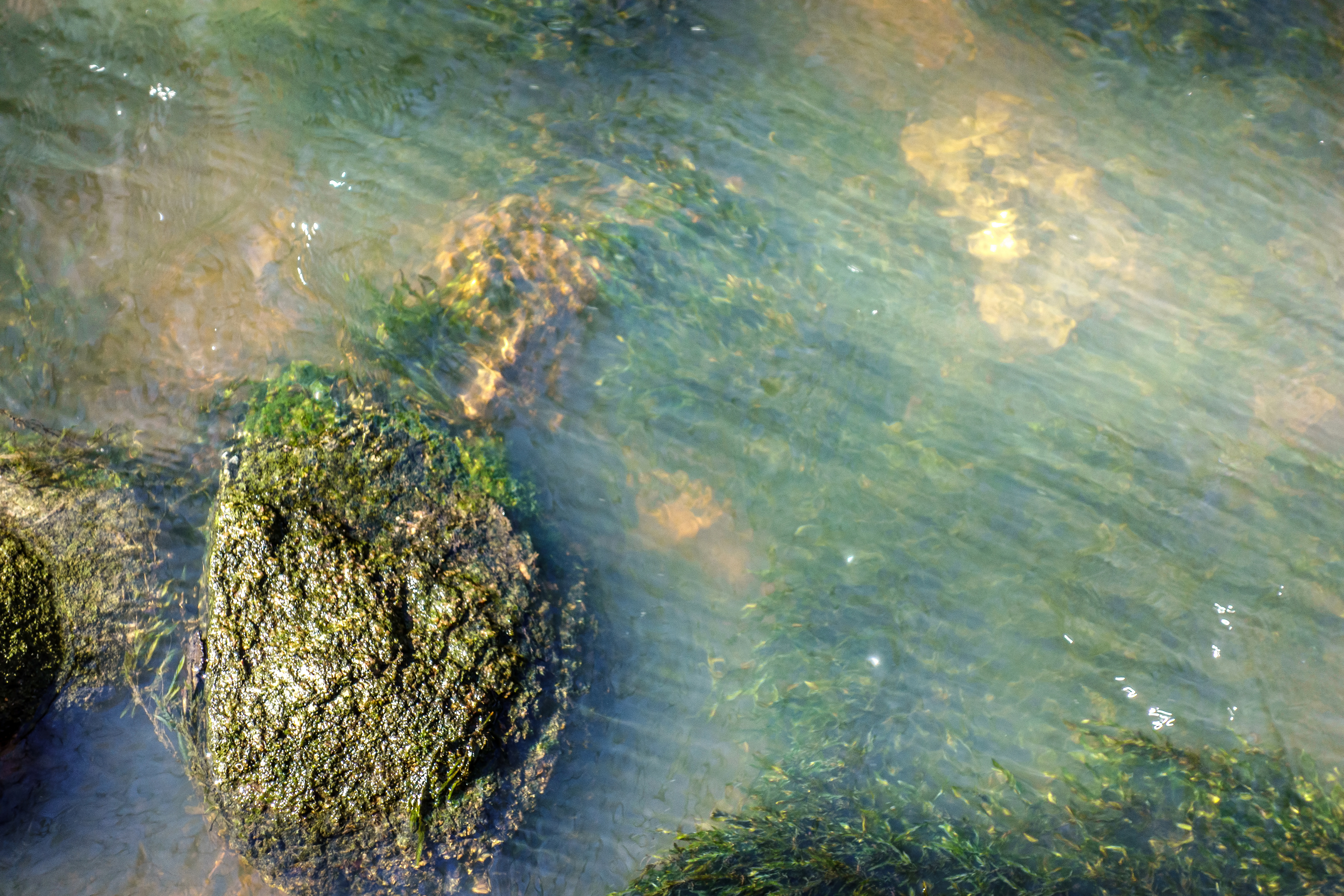
A stream carrying silt from fields in Brastad, Sweden

A simple explanation for silt formation is that it is a straightforward continuation to a smaller scale of the disintegration of rock into gravel and sand. However, the presence of a Tanner gap between sand and silt (a scarcity of particles with sizes between 30 and 120 microns) suggests that different physical processes produce sand and silt. The mechanisms of silt formation have been studied extensively in the laboratory and compared with field observations. These show that silt formation requires high-energy processes acting over long periods of time, but such processes are present in diverse geologic settings.

Quartz silt grains are usually found to have a platy or bladed shape. This may be characteristic of how larger grains abrade, or reflect the shape of small quartz grains in foliated metamorphic rock, or arise from authigenic growth of quartz grains parallel to bedding in sedimentary rock. Theoretically, particles formed by random fracturing of an isotropic material, such as quartz, naturally tend to be blade-shaped. The size of silt grains produced by abrasion or shattering of larger grains may reflect defects in the crystal structure of the quartz, known as Moss defects. Such defects are produced by tectonic deformation of the parent rock, and also arise from the high-low transition of quartz: Quartz experiences a sharp decrease in volume when it cools below a temperature of about 573 °C (1,063 °F), which creates strain and crystal defects in the quartz grains in a cooling body of granite.

Mechanisms for silt production include:

- Erosion of initially silt-sized grains from low-grade metamorphic rock.
- Production of silt-sized grains from fracture of larger grains during initial rock weathering and soil formation, through processes such as frost shattering and haloclasty. This produces silt particles whose size of 10–30 microns is determined by Moss defects.
- Production of silt-sized grains from grain-to-grain impact during transport of coarser sediments.
- Formation of authigenic quartz during weathering to clay.
- Crystallization of the tests of siliceous organisms deposited in mudrock.

Laboratory experiments have produced contradictory results regarding the effectiveness of various silt production mechanisms. This may be due to the use of vein or pegmatite quartz in some of the experiments. Both materials form under conditions promoting ideal crystal growth, and may lack the Moss defects of quartz grains in granites. Thus production of silt from vein quartz is very difficult by any mechanism, whereas production of silt from granite quartz proceeds readily by any of a number of mechanisms. However, the main process is likely abrasion through transport, including fluvial comminution, aeolian attrition and glacial grinding.

Because silt deposits (such as loess, a soil composed mostly of silt) seem to be associated with glaciated or mountainous regions in Asia and North America, much emphasis has been placed on glacial grinding as a source of silt. High Asia has been identified as a major generator of silt, which accumulated to form the fertile soils of north India and Bangladesh, and the loess of central Asia and north China. Loess has long been thought to be absent or rare in deserts lacking nearby mountains (Sahara, Australia). However, laboratory experiments show eolian and fluvial processes can be quite efficient at producing silt, as can weathering in tropical climates. Silt seems to be produced in great quantities in dust storms, and silt deposits found in Israel, Tunisia, Nigeria, and Saudi Arabia cannot be attributed to glaciation. Furthermore, desert source areas in Asia may be more important for loess formation than previously thought. Part of the problem may be the conflation of high rates of production with environments conducive to deposition and preservation, which favors glacial climates more than deserts.

Loess associated with glaciation and cold weathering may be distinguishable from loess associated with hot regions by the size distribution. Glacial loess has a typical particle size of about 25 microns. Desert loess contains either larger or smaller particles, with the fine silt produced in dust storms and the coarse silt fraction possibly representing the fine particle tail of sand production.

== Human impact ==
Loess underlies some of the most productive agricultural land worldwide. However, it is very susceptible to erosion. The quartz particles in silt do not themselves provide nutrients, but they promote excellent soil structure, and silt-sized particles of other minerals, present in smaller amounts, provide the necessary nutrients. Silt, deposited by annual floods along the Nile River, created the rich, fertile soil that sustained the Ancient Egyptian civilization. The closure of the Aswan High Dam has cut off this source of silt, and the fertility of the Nile delta is deteriorating.

Loess tends to lose strength when wetted, and this can lead to failure of building foundations. The silty material has an open structure that collapses when wet. Quick clay (a combination of very fine silt and clay-sized particles from glacial grinding) is a particular challenge for civil engineering.

The failure of the Teton Dam has been attributed to the use of loess from the Snake River floodplain in the core of the dam. Loess lacks the necessary plasticity for use in a dam core, but its properties were poorly understood, even by the U.S. Bureau of Reclamation, with its wealth of experience building earthen dams.

Silt is susceptible to liquefaction during strong earthquakes due to its lack of plasticity. This has raised concerns about the earthquake damage potential in the silty soil of the central United States in the event of a major earthquake in the New Madrid Seismic Zone.

== Environmental impacts ==
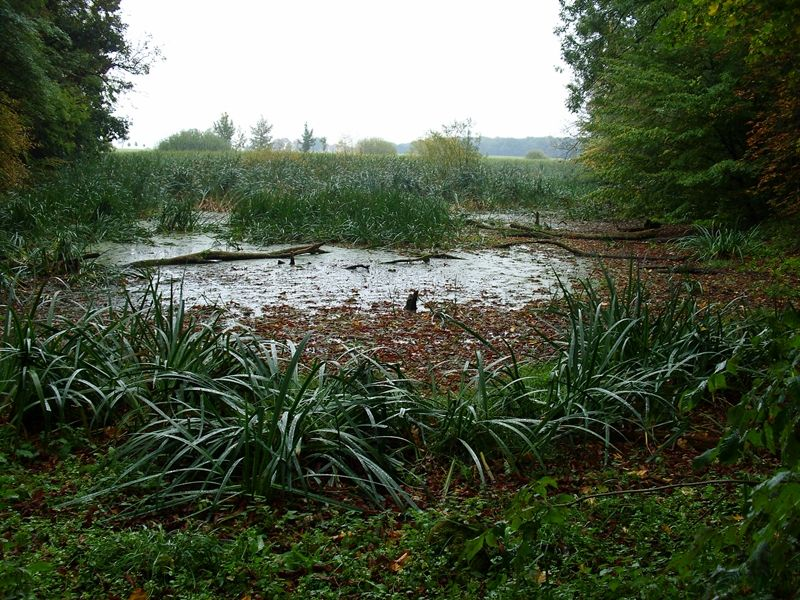
A silted lake located in Eichhorst, Germany

Silt is easily transported in water and is fine enough to be carried long distances by air in the form of dust. While the coarsest silt particles (60 micron) settle out of a meter of still water in just five minutes, the finest silt grains (2 microns) can take several days to settle out of still water. When silt appears as a pollutant in water the phenomenon is known as siltation.

Silt deposited by the Mississippi River throughout the 20th century has decreased due to a system of levees, contributing to the disappearance of protective wetlands and barrier islands in the delta region surrounding New Orleans.

In southeast Bangladesh, in the Noakhali district, cross dams were built in the 1960s whereby silt gradually started forming new land called "chars". The district of Noakhali has gained more than 73 square kilometres (28 sq mi) of land in the past 50 years. With Dutch funding, the Bangladeshi government began to help develop older chars in the late 1970s, and the effort has since become a multi-agency operation building roads, culverts, embankments, cyclone shelters, toilets and ponds, as well as distributing land to settlers. By fall 2010, the program will have allotted some 100 square kilometres (20,000 acres) to 21,000 families.

A main source of silt in urban rivers is disturbance of soil by construction activity. A main source in rural rivers is erosion from plowing of farm fields, clearcutting or slash and burn treatment of forests.

== Culture ==
The fertile black silt of the Nile river's banks is a symbol of rebirth, associated with the Egyptian god Anubis.

== See also ==
- Aleurite
- Erosion control
- Nonpoint source pollution
- Sediment control
- Silt fence
