= Corrasion =

Corrasion is a geomorphological term for the process of mechanical erosion of the earth's surface caused when materials are transported across it by running water, waves, glaciers, wind or gravitational movement downslope. An example is the wearing away of rock on a river or seabed by the impact or grinding action of particles moving with the water. The resultant effect on the rock is called abrasion.

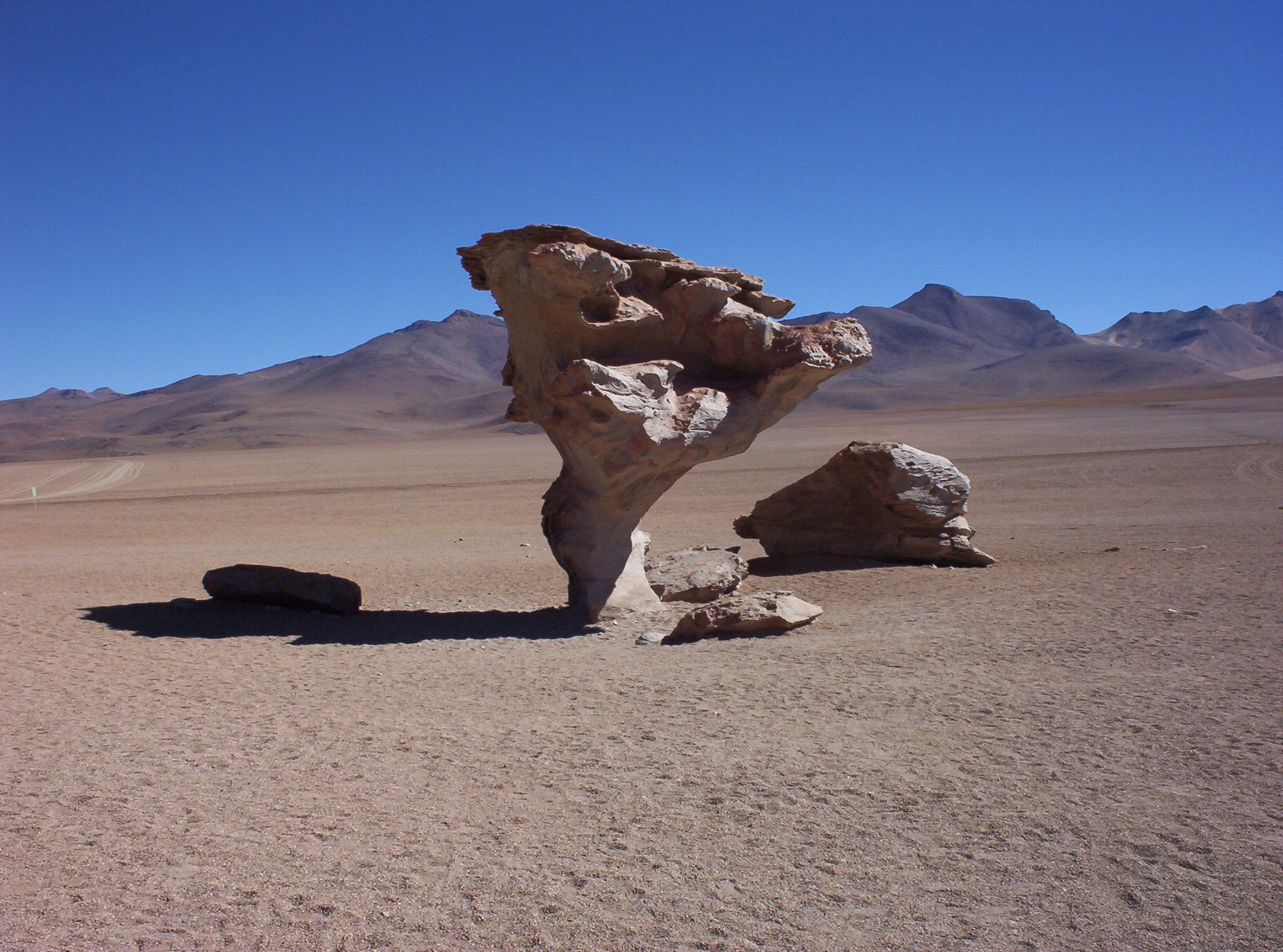
Stone Tree, a mushroom-shaped rock sculpted by the phenomenon of corrasion, in the Bolivian Altiplano.

Corrasion is different from corrosion which is due to chemical and solvent action of water on soluble or partly soluble rocks when they come in contact.

Corrasion acts in two ways:

1. Lateral corrasion : the sideways erosion which widens the river.
2. Vertical corrasion: downward erosion which deepens the river valley.

Thus corrasion is a form of erosion.

== See also ==
- Attrition (erosion)
- Bratschen
- Coastal erosion
- Helicoidal flow
- Hydraulic action
