= Post-glacial clay =

Post-glacial clay (Swedish: Postglacial lera) is any sedimentary clay layer or deposit that formed after retreating glaciers have abandoned an area. The term is used in Sweden. Compared to glacial clay, post-glacial clay tend to be less rich in calcium carbonate. In some places like around Göta Älv post-glacial clay distinguishes itself by having lower silt content than the glacial clays under it.

== Bibliography ==
- Rankka, Karin; Andersson-Sköld, Yvonne; Hultén, Carina; Larsson, Rolf; Leroux, Virginie; Dahlin, Torleif (2004-01-01). Quick clay in Sweden (PDF) (Report). Vol. 65. Swedish Geotechnical Institute. p. 30.
