= Hinterer Bratschenkopf =

Mountain in the Austrian Central Alps

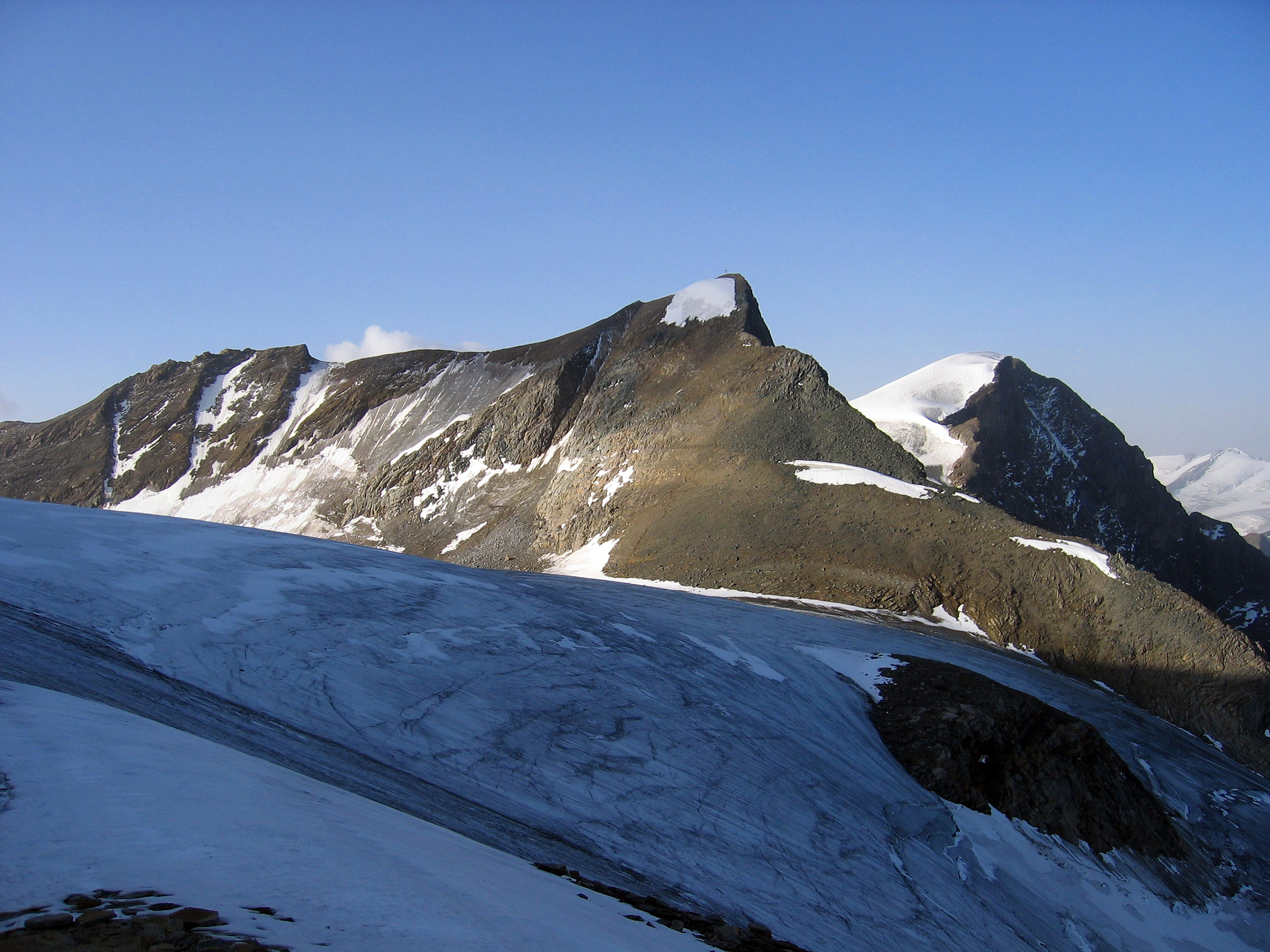
- The Vorderer (left) and Hinterer Bratschenkopf (middle, with summit cross), with the Klockerin (right), seen from Kaindlgrat to the north

Highest point
- Elevation: 3,413 m (AA) (11,198 ft)
- Coordinates: 47°09′07″N 12°34′09″E

Geography
- Location within Austria
- Location: Salzburg, Austria
- Parent range: Hohe Tauern, Glockner Group, Fusch/Kaprun Crest

Geology
- Mountain type(s): calc-schist, Bratschen

Climbing
- First ascent: 18 September 1869 by Karl Hofmann, Johann Stüdl and mountain guides, Thomas Groder and Josef Schnell
- Easiest route: from the Heinrich Schwaiger Haus over the Kaindlgrat, the Wielingerscharte and the northeast flank to the summit

The Hinterer Bratschenkopf is a mountain in the Glockner Group on the Fusch-Kaprun ridge (Fuscher / Kapruner Kamm) in the High Tauern, a high mountain range in the Austrian Central Alps. According to the listed sources it is 3,412 metres high, but the Austrian Federal Office for Metrology and Survey gives its height as 3,413 metres. The mountain lies in the Austrian state of Salzburg. It appears from the north, east and south as a gently curved firn summit, but from the west it has a mighty, 1,400-metre-high (4,600 ft) and 40 to 60° rock face. A steep, 500-metre-long (1,600 ft) knife-edge ridge bears away from the mountaintop to the north. Due to its close proximity to the Heinrich Schwaiger Haus, the summit is a popular viewing point. The peak was first climbed on 18 September 1869 by the Munich Alpinist, Karl Hofmann, the Prague businessman, Johann Stüdl, and mountain guides Thomas Groder and Josef Schnell from Kals am Großglockner.

== Origin of the name ==
The name "Hinterer Bratschenkopf" was given to the mountain in 1871 on the recommendation of the Imperial and Royal Austrian survey officer, Major Joseph Pelikan, of Plauenwald. On the old Tauern map by Franz Keil dating to 1855 the peak was still described as the Glockerin, which went back to Karl Sonklar and Johann Stüdl, whilst the peak known today as the Klockerin was still unknown then. The word bratschen in German means the broken piles of calc-schist rock often found at height in the High Tauern.

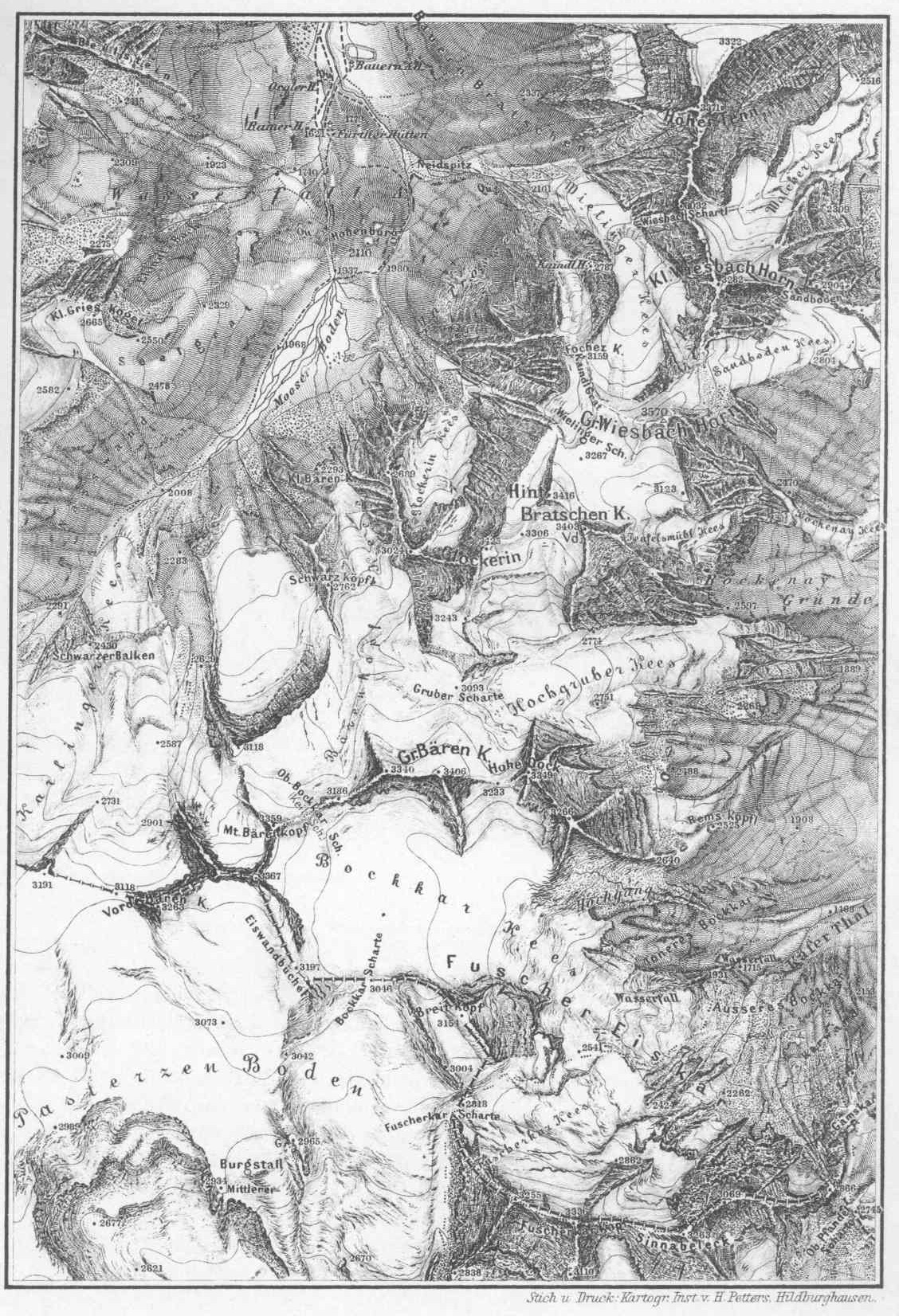
1891 Alpine Club map, 1:50.000 series

The names of the surrounding mountains were rather confusing. "Kleiner", "Mittlerer", "Großer" and "Vorderer Bärenkopf" (i.e. "Little", "Middle", "Great" and "Fore") were designations arbitrarily given to different peaks and, in some cases, the same peaks. Not until the 1891 Alpine Club map was issued was there an authoritative allocation of names, that gave a recognised schema for Alpinists and reduced the then common difficulties of orientation and mistakes in climbing and surveying.

== Surrounding area ==
The Hinterer Bratschenkopf is ringed by glaciers. To the northeast lies the little Kaindlkees glacier, to the east is the accumulation zone of the Teufelsmühlkees which reaches to just below the summit. To the south lies the Bratschenkopfkees and, in the west, below the mighty West Face, the (Untere) Klockerinkees. Important neighbouring peaks are:

- the Vordere Bratschenkopf (3,401 m) on the Southeast Ridge (Südostgrat) separated by the notch of the Bratschenkopfscharte (3,383 m)
- the Klockerin (3,425 m) on the other side of the 3,295-metre-high (10,810 ft) ice divide between the Bratschenkopfkees and Oberes Klockerinkees.

The highest mountain in the area, the Großes Wiesbachhorn (3,564 m), lies away to the northeast. The nearest significant settlement is Fusch an der Großglocknerstraße, just under 11 kilometres to the north as the crow flies. To the northwest the Hinterer Bratschenkopf falls steeply to the dam of the Mooserboden.

== Bases and tours ==
The trail blazed by the Alpinists in 1869 runs from the Kaprun side, i.e. from the north, over the glacier saddle with the misleading name of Wielingerscharte ("Wielingen Notch") to the top. This route is still the standard one used today. The Hinterer Bratschenkopf can only be reached as part of a high Alpine tour, and appropriate equipment and glacier experience are necessary. The Heinrich Schwaiger Haus (2,802 m) acts as a base and lies to the east above the Mooserboden valley. From the hut, the trail runs in a southeasterly direction up to the Oberen Fochezkopf (3,159 m), over the firn-covered Kaindlgrat ridge on the upper Wielingerkees glacier, past the foot of the West Ridge of the Wiesbachhorn (Wiesbachhorn-Westgrat), then southwards over the so-called Wielingerscharte to the Bratschenkopfscharte and up to the summit cross of the Hinterer Bratschenkopf. According to the literature, the journey takes about 2 to 3 hours, depending on the conditions. Another option is the easy firn ascent from the southeast. More difficult climbs run from the Schwarzenberg Hut (2,267 m) to the south, over the Hochgruberkees and Bratschenkopfkees as an ice tour up the South Flank with gradients of 40 to 60°. Climbing routes of grade UIAA III run up the steep North Ridge (Nordgrat), a climb of 620 metres. Routes of up to about UIAA grade III+ difficulty and 1,300 metres in height run up the West Face, first conquered in 1928, but there is a high risk there of falling rocks.

== Sources and maps ==
- Willi End: Glocknergruppe Alpine Club Guide, Bergverlag Rother, Munich, 2003, ISBN 3-7633-1266-8
- Zeitschrift des Deutschen und Oesterreichischen Alpenvereins: Band III, p. 68, Munich, 1872
- Eduard Richter: Die Erschließung der Ostalpen, Vol. III, Verlag des Deutschen und Oesterreichischen Alpenvereins, Berlin 1894
- Alpine Club map 1:25.000, Sheet 40, Glocknergruppe
