= Abrasion (geology) =

Process of erosion

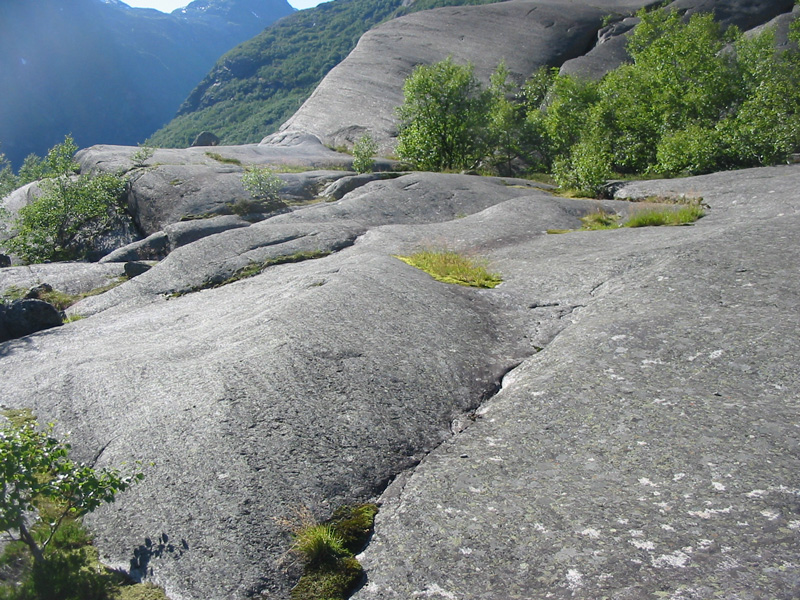
Glacially abraded rocks in western Norway near Jostedalsbreen generation

Abrasion is a process of weathering that occurs when material being transported wears away at a surface over time, commonly occurring with ice and glaciers. The primary process of abrasion is physical weathering. Its the process of friction caused by scuffing, scratching, wearing down, marring, and rubbing away of materials. The intensity of abrasion depends on the hardness, concentration, velocity and mass of the moving particles. Abrasion generally occurs in four ways: glaciation slowly grinds rocks picked up by ice against rock surfaces; solid objects transported in river channels make abrasive surface contact with the bed and walls; objects transported in waves breaking on coastlines; and by wind transporting sand or small stones against surface rocks. Abrasion is the natural scratching of bedrock by a continuous movement of snow or glacier downhill. This is caused by a force, friction, vibration, or internal deformation of the ice, and by sliding over the rocks and sediments at the base (that also causes an avalanche) that causes the glacier to move.

Abrasion, under its strictest definition, is commonly confused with attrition and sometimes hydraulic action however, the latter less commonly so. Both abrasion and attrition refers to the wearing down of an object. Abrasion occurs as a result of two surfaces rubbing against each other, resulting in the wearing down of one or both of the surfaces. However, attrition refers to the breaking off of particles (erosion) which occurs as a result of objects hitting against each other. Abrasion leads to surface-level destruction over a period of time, whereas attrition results in more change at a faster rate. Today, the geomorphology community uses the term "abrasion" in a looser way, often interchangeably with the term "wear".

== In channel transport ==
Abrasion in a stream or river channel occurs when the sediment carried by a river scours the bed and banks, contributing significantly to erosion. In addition to chemical and physical weathering of hydraulic action, freeze-thaw cycles, and more, there is a suite of processes which have long been considered to contribute significantly to bedrock channel erosion including plucking, abrasion (due to both bedload and suspended load), solution, and cavitation. In terms of a glacier, it is a similar principal; the moving of rocks over a surface wears it away with friction, digging a channel that, when the glacier moves away, is called a U-shaped valley.

Bedload transport consists of mostly larger clasts, which cannot be picked up by the velocity of the streamflow, rolling, sliding, and/or saltating (bouncing) downstream along the bed. Suspended load typically refers to smaller particles, such as silt, clay, and finer grain sands uplifted by processes of sediment transport. Grains of various sizes and composition are transported differently in terms of the threshold flow velocities required to dislodge and deposit them, as is modeled in the Hjulström curve. These grains polish and scour the bedrock and banks when they make abrasive contact.

== In coastal erosion ==
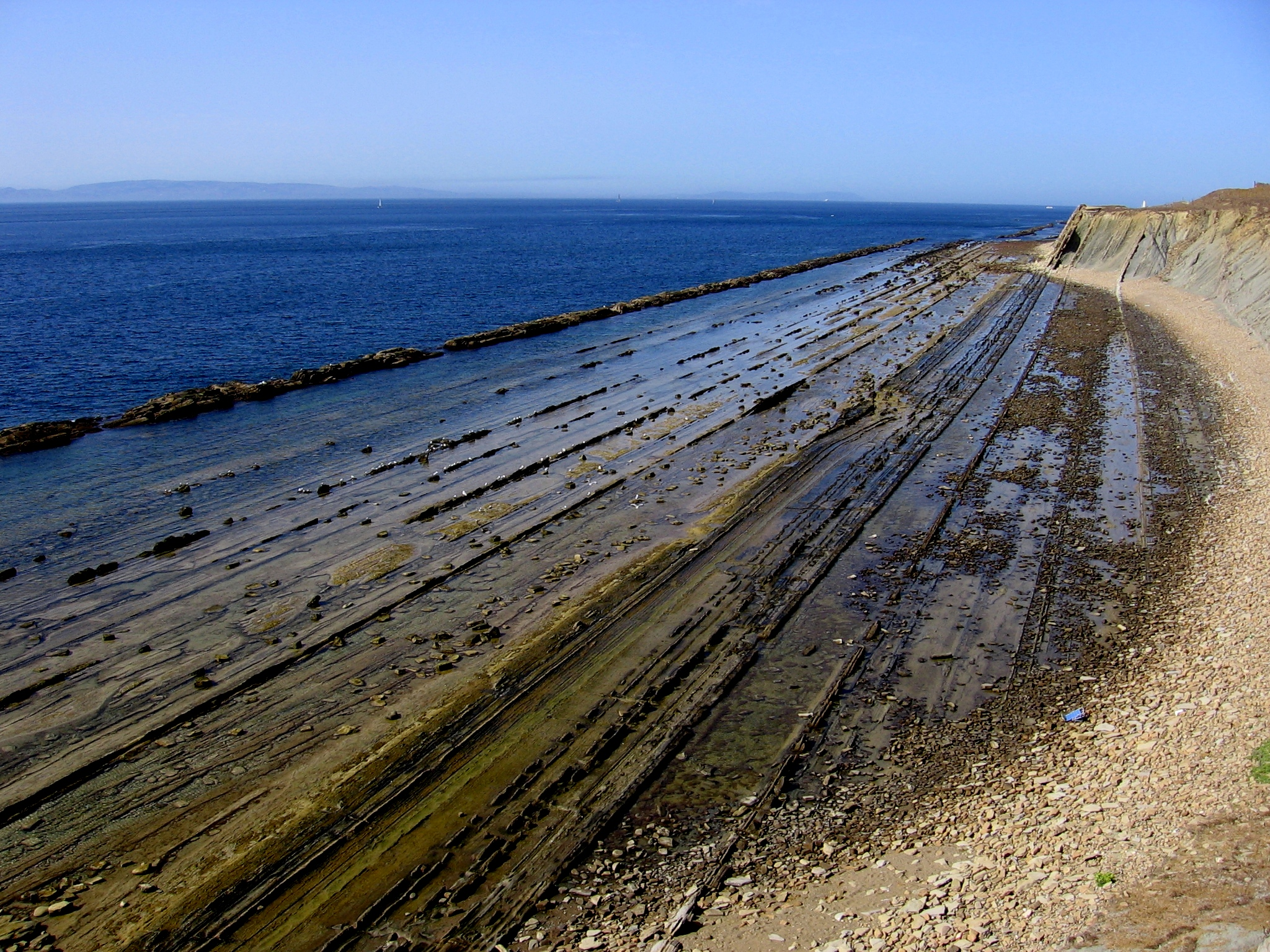
Abrasion platform in the Parque Natural del Estrecho, at the Strait of Gibraltar coast in Andalusia, Spain

Coastal abrasion occurs as breaking ocean waves containing a sand and larger fragments erode the shoreline or headland. The hydraulic action of waves contributes heavily. This removes material, resulting in undercutting and possible collapse of unsupported overhanging cliffs. This erosion can threaten structure or infrastructure on coastlines, and the impact will very likely increase as global warming increases sea level rise. Seawalls are sometimes built-in defense, but in many locations, conventional coastal engineering solutions such as sea walls are increasingly challenged and their maintenance may become unsustainable due to changes in climate conditions, sea-level rise, land subsidence, and sediment supply.

Abrasion platforms are shore platforms where wave action abrasion is a prominent process. If it is currently being fashioned, it will be exposed only at low tide, but there is a possibility that the wave-cut platform will be hidden sporadically by a mantle of beach shingle (the abrading agent). If the platform is permanently exposed above the high-water mark, it is probably a raised beach platform, which is not considered a product of abrasion but may be undercut by abrasion as sea level rises.

== From glaciation ==
Glacial abrasion is the surface wear achieved by individual clasts, or rocks of various sizes, contained within ice or by subglacial sediment as the glacier slides over bedrock. Abrasion can crush smaller grains or particles and remove grains or multigrain fragments, but the removal of larger fragments is classified as plucking (or quarrying), the other major erosion source from glaciers. Plucking creates the debris at the base or sides of the glacier that causes abrasion. While plucking has generally been thought of as a greater force of geomorphological change, there is evidence that in softer rocks with wide joint spacing that abrasion can be just as efficient. A smooth, polished surface is left behind by glacial abrasion, sometimes with glacial striations, which provide information about the mechanics of abrasion under temperate glaciers.

== From wind ==
Much consideration has been given to the role of wind as an agent of geomorphological change on Earth and other planets (Greely & Iversen 1987). Aeolian processes involve wind eroding materials, such as exposed rock, and moving particles through the air to contact other materials and deposit them elsewhere. These forces are notably similar to models in fluvial environments. Aeolian processes demonstrate their most notable consequences in arid regions of sparse and abundant unconsolidated sediments, such as sand. There is now evidence that bedrock canyons, landforms traditionally thought to evolve only from the fluvial forces of flowing water, may indeed be extended by the aeolian forces of wind, perhaps even amplifying bedrock canyon incision rates by an order of magnitude above fluvial abrasion rates. Redistribution of materials by wind occurs at multiple geographic scales and can have important consequences for regional ecology and landscape evolution.
