= Bratschen =

Weathering products of certain rocks in the Alps

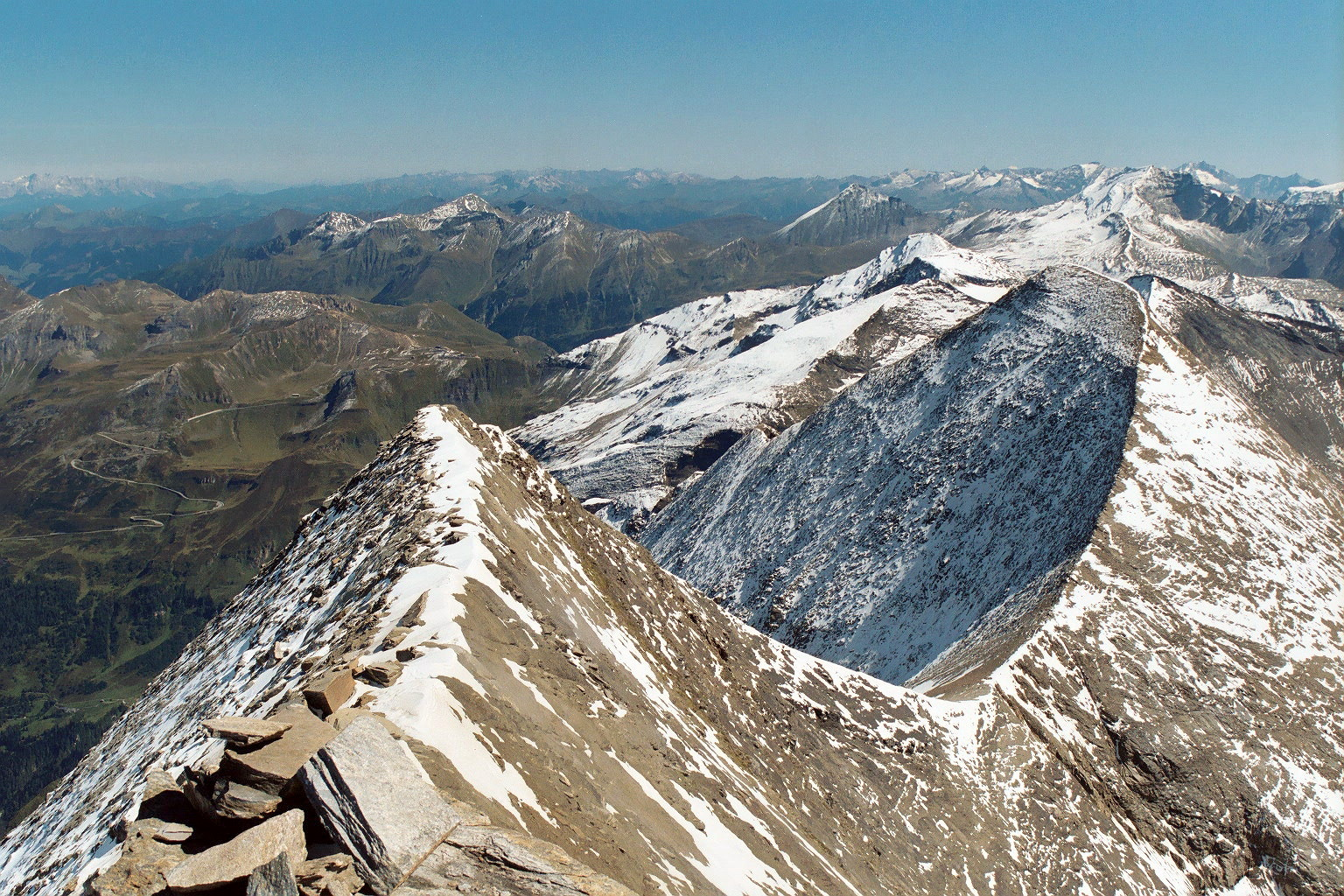
The east ridge of the Fuscherkarkopf looking toward Sinwelleck

Bratschen are weathering products that occur as a result of frost and aeolian corrasion almost exclusively on the calc-schists of the Upper Slate Mantle (Obere Schieferhülle) in the High Tauern mountains of Austria. The term is German but is used untranslated in English sources.

The calc-schist, which appears blue-gray when freshly broken, weathers to a yellow to brown colour and flakes off on the surface to form bratschen.

These form steep (up to 40°), rocky, almost unvegetated mountainsides with an odd and rough-textured surface, caused by wind erosion. Bratschen are found on the mountains such as the Fuscherkarkopf, the Großer Bärenkopf, the Kitzsteinhorn, the Schwerteck, or on the eponymous Bratschenköpfen.

== Sources ==
- Karl Krainer (2005), Nationalpark Hohe Tauern GEOLOGIE – Wissenschaftliche Schriften (in German) (2nd ed.), Klagenfurt: Universitätsverlag Carinthia, p. 140, ISBN 3-85378-585-9
