= Attrition (erosion) =

Attrition in geography is the process of erosion that occurs during rock collision and transportation. The transportation of sediment chips and smooths the surfaces of bedrock; this can be through water or wind. Rocks undergoing attrition erosion are often found on or near the bed of a stream. Attrition is also partially responsible for turning boulders into smaller rocks and eventually to sand.

Attrition erosion allows past and present geologic changes to be understood as well as paleogeomorphic environments to be interpreted. Researchers use particle shapes (a result of attrition) to study erosion and environmental changes.

== Mechanism ==
Effects of attrition along the Haast River in New Zealand

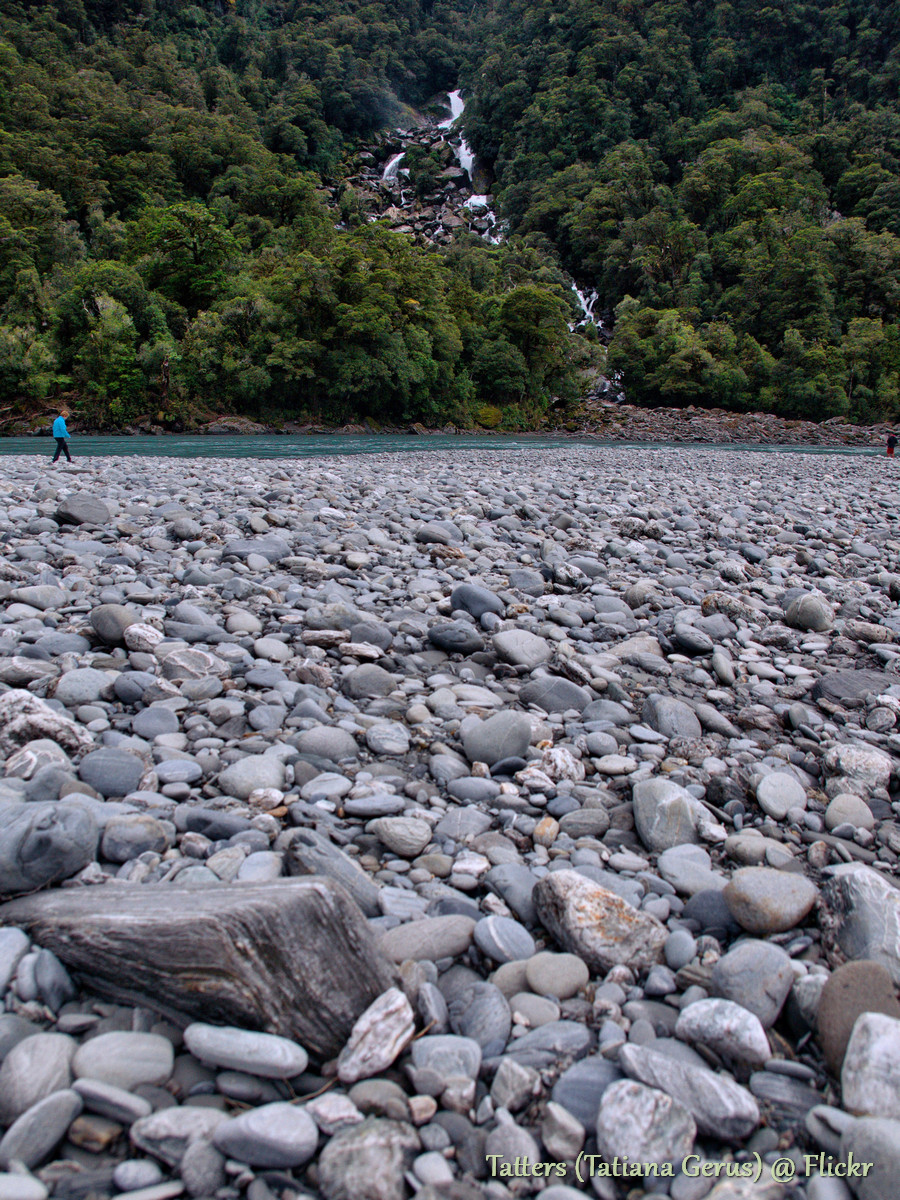
Pebbles tend to be larger upstream...

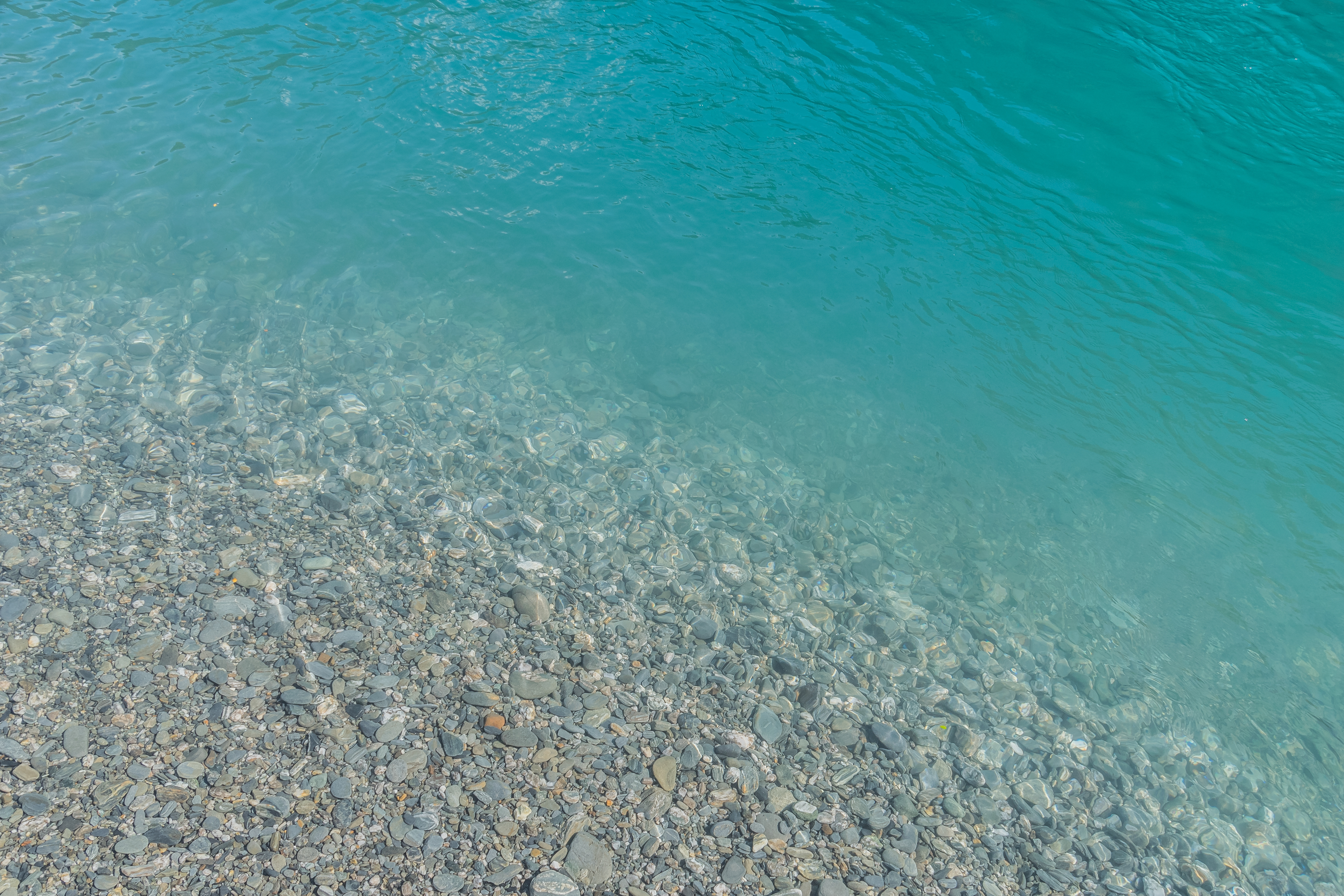
...and decrease farther downstream...

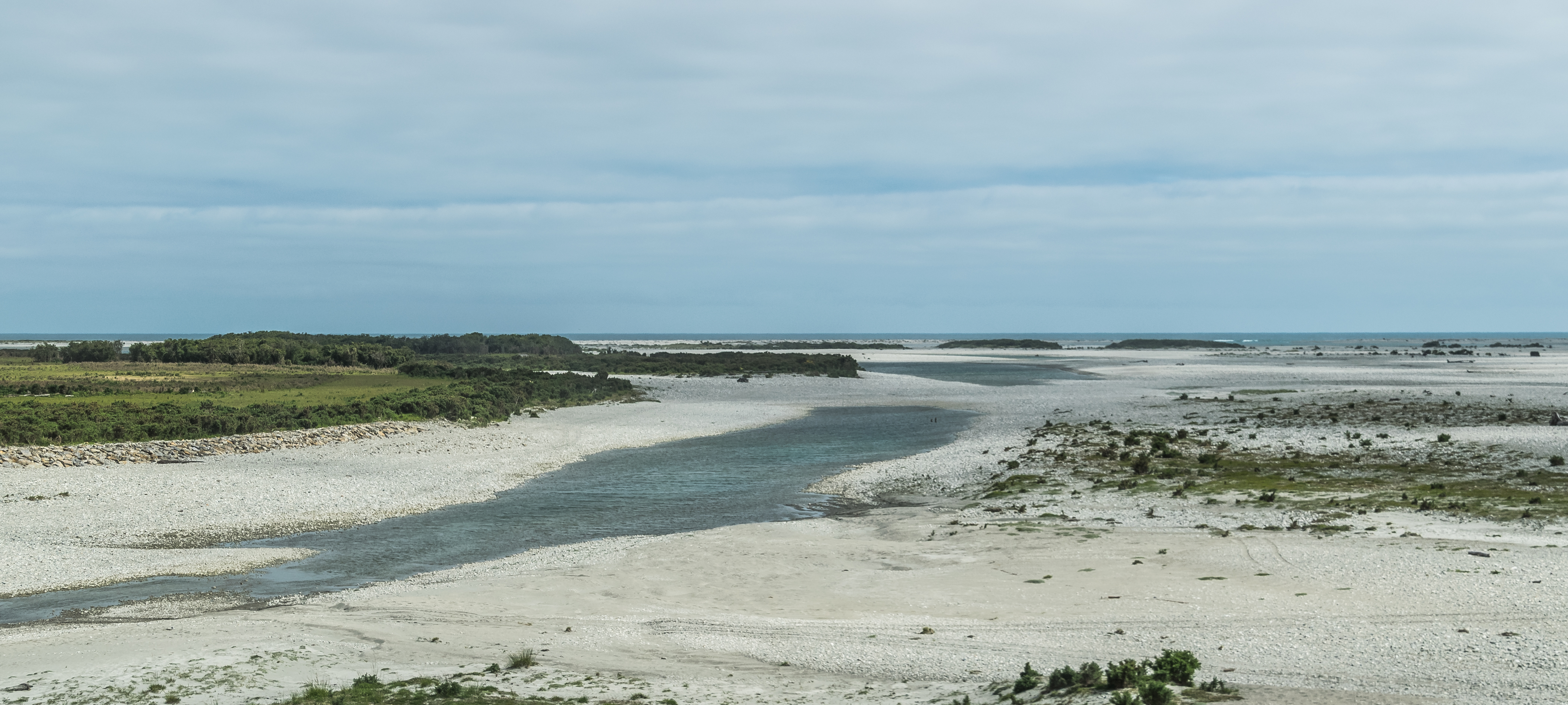
until they are reduced to sand and silt at the mouth.

The amount of attrition is dependent on a number of factors: particle properties such as size, shape, surface, porosity, hardness, and cracks, as well as environmental properties such as time, velocity, pressure, shear, and temperature.

Generally, particles are more affected by attrition farther downstream, as the rivers' velocity tends to be higher, and therefore its competence (ability to carry sediment) is increased. This means that the load rubs against itself more and with more force when suspended in the river, thus increasing erosion by attrition. Although there is a point after transport over a certain distance that pebbles reach a size that is relatively immune to further attrition. Grain-size distribution of sediments produced by attrition will also be controlled by the lithology of the rock from which they are derived. Particle sizes generally decrease continuously as the river flows farther downstream, in a process called downstream fining. Since attrition affects pebble size it also affects the movement of the pebbles, and the size and condition of pebbles can explain past conditions of waterways, such as flow.

== Rate of erosion ==
Rates of erosion by attrition are affected by the rocks shape, lithology, and the energy of impact, therefore, softer rocks are more susceptible to attrition erosion. As attrition and breakage occur on a bedrock it becomes suspended: down-stream of a river or waterway the bedload increases due to attrition. The suspended sediment is greatly affected by lithology, basin slope, precipitation, and wildfires; wildfires in general significantly disturb environments and therefore their geology. Erosion rates, with respect to attrition, are greatest in waterways that are steep with soft rocks, such as shale, mudstone, or other common sedimentary rocks.

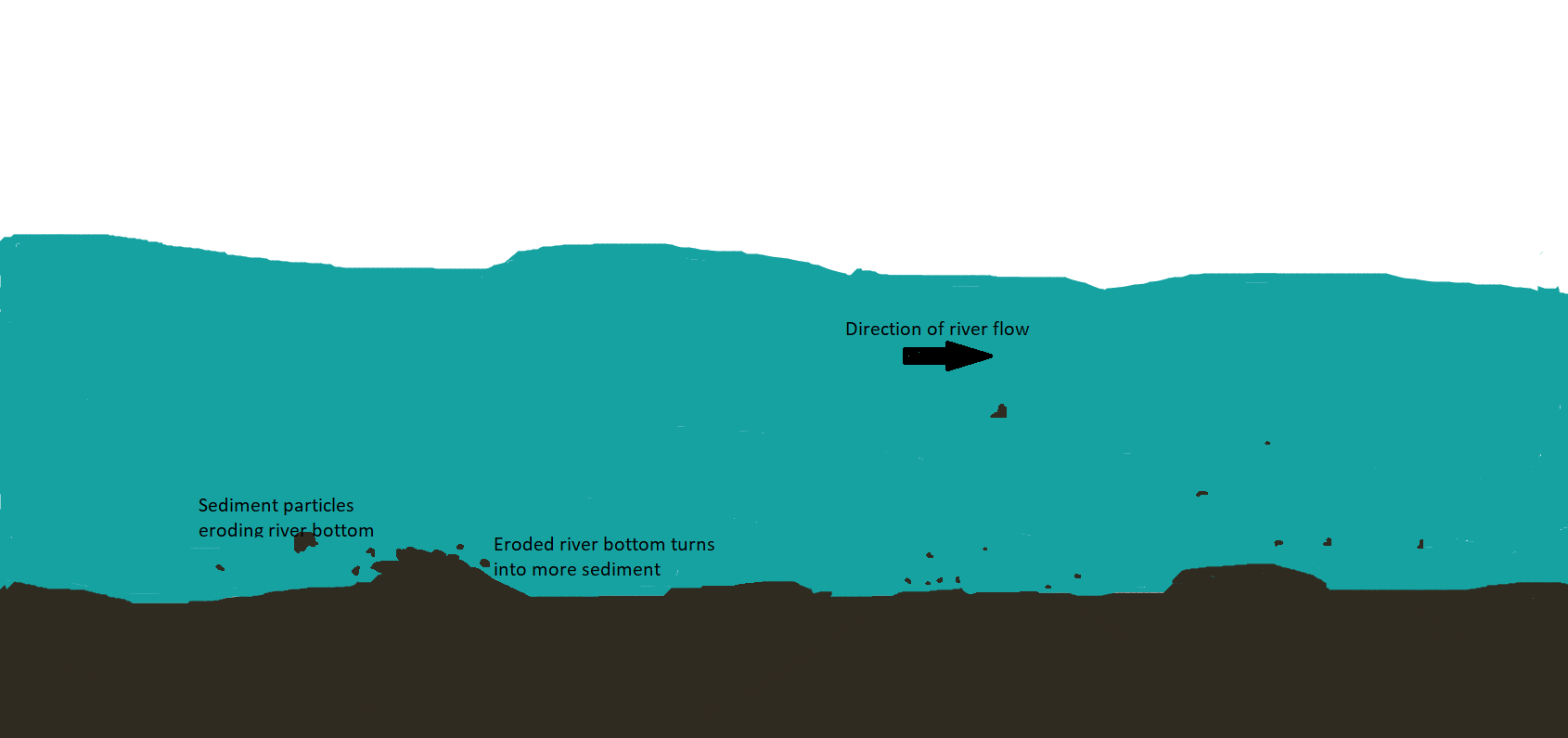
Sediment particles eroding a river bed.

The rounding of rocks and sand grains happens much slower in water environments than from wind. This is because the water molecules around the sand protects it from collisions and because the density of water lowers the impact energy. Additionally, the more irregular (compared to rounded) a sediments particle is the more it is susceptible to erosion. However, rounded particles are often the result of severe erosional environments.

Differences in lithology affect how quickly erosion (attrition) changes a shoreline. It has been observed that schist rocks round quickly but then are quickly eroded away. While quartzite stays rounded for a longer time. Quartzite has been found to round easily compared to schist and sandstone. Schists often erode into a flat surface under high energy attrition, not a rounded particle. Sandstone erodes to a shape between quartzite and schist. Rocks that have undergone chemical alterations, like lithification, tend to strongly resist erosion.

=== Cosmogenic exposure ===
Erosion can affect the cosmogenic exposure dating of boulders by altering the cosmogenic isotope concentration. So, by finding the cosmogenic exposure for two samples of the same rock the exposure time and rate of erosion can be found. The more accurate and isotope measurement is the more accurate the erosion rate or exposure time will be.

Cosmogenic exposure dating is a powerful tool in understating the process rocks undergo and can lead to a greater understanding in geomorphological studies.

== Attrition in ocean environments ==
Attrition in ocean environments is described as “the oceans consuming the land” because the high impact energy of waves and high sedimentation allow the ocean-land contact points to be significantly eroded. Ocean attrition causes shorelines to retreat and ocean depths are increased to the depth of the wave base.

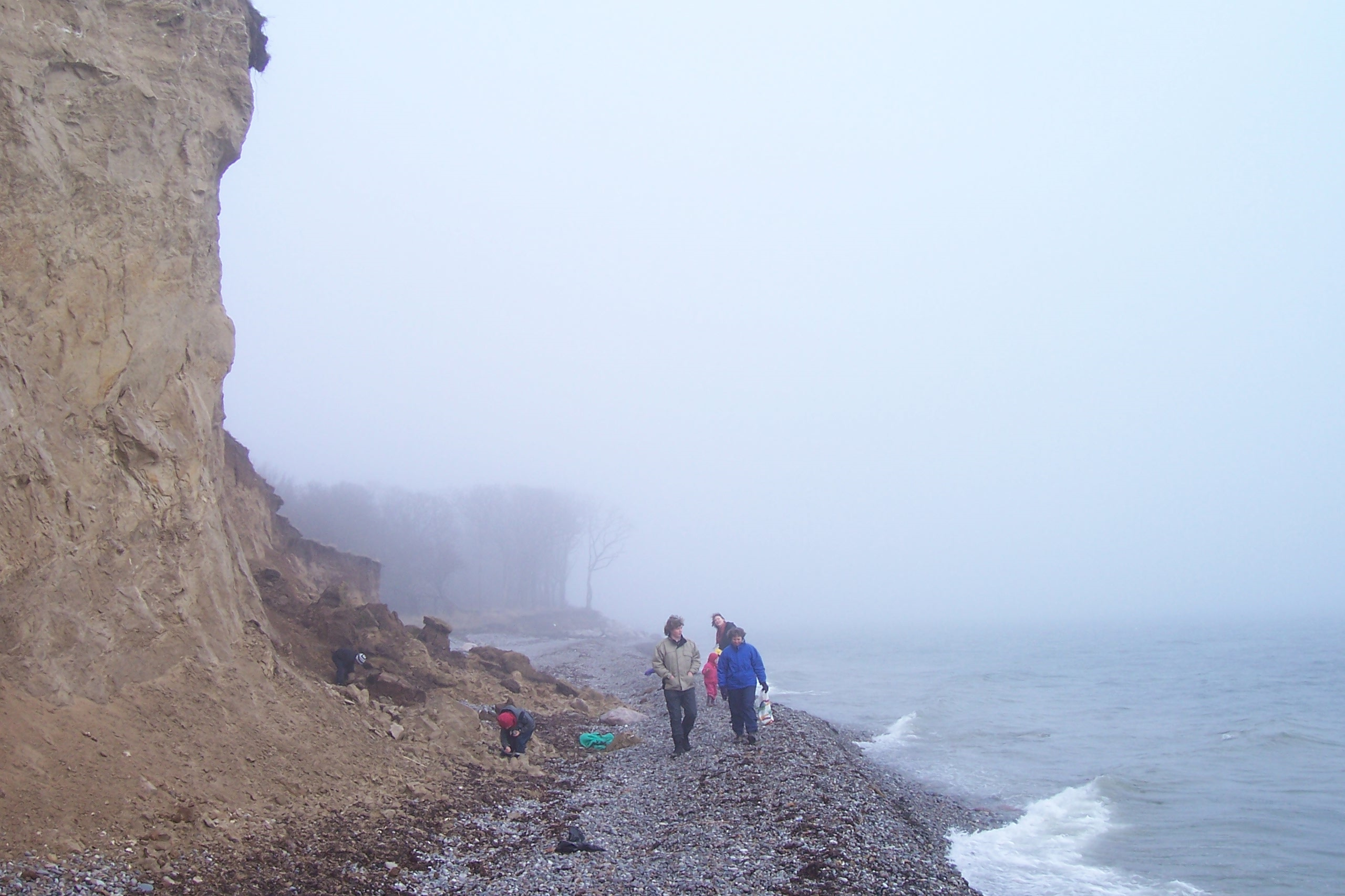
Attrition erosion of the coast in Langeland, Denmark, shows how high impact energy of sediment particles affect ocean-land contact points.

The rising of sea levels has led to an increase in coastal erosion. This causes concern to policymakers, coastal researchers, and real estate planners due to erosions effect on flooding.

Rocky coastlines tend to lack vegetation: this leads to little or no humic acid (organic compounds like soil). No humic acid means there is less chemical erosion, so the erosion on coastlines are almost exclusively caused by particle collisions.

== Attrition in volcanic settings ==
As ash and volcanic pyroclasts erupt from a volcano they undergo attrition. Attrition is one of the reasons why volcanic ash is very fine-grained. The more attrition erosion the more fine-grained ash produced. The consequence of this is the disruption of a volcano's geologic stability, varied tephra (rock and particles expelled from the volcano during the eruption), and more particles in the atmosphere affecting climate. The rate of attrition on tephra is affected by the size of the volcano- specifically the depth and height of the volcanic column.

== Similar processes ==
The effects of attrition can be mistaken for the effects of sorting, in which the grain size of sediments is affected by sediment transport mechanisms e.g. suspension vs. bed load. This affects pebble beaches the most as the pebbles smash into each other, which causes them to smooth.

Attrition of particulate material is also observed in the chemical industry, where it is undesirable. Products can be lost through the process and contaminants can be created, requiring additional filtration.

Attrition occurring in an industrial application stems from a wide range of mechanisms: mechanical, thermal, and chemical. In abrasive blasting, the useful life of the abrasive (sand or shot) is limited by attrition because as the workpiece surface is worn down, the abrasive breaks down as well. Attrition contributes to other types of erosion such as deflation and corrasion. Although attrition is often considered a type of corrasion they differ because attrition does not move stationary surfaces and instead erodes them through transited materials.
