= Hydraulic action =

Force of water and tapped air pockets against a rock surface

Hydraulic action, most generally, is the ability of moving water (flowing or waves) to dislodge and transport rock particles. This includes a number of specific erosional processes, including abrasion, at facilitated erosion, such as static erosion where water leaches salts and floats off organic material from unconsolidated sediments, and from chemical erosion more often called chemical weathering. It is a mechanical process, in which the moving water current flows against the banks and bed of a river, thereby removing rock particles. A primary example of hydraulic action is a wave striking a cliff face which compresses the air in cracks of the rocks. This exerts pressure on the surrounding rock which can progressively crack, break, splinter and detach rock particles. This is followed by the decompression of the air as the wave retreats which can occur suddenly with explosive force which additionally weakens the rock. Cracks are gradually widened so each wave compresses more air, increasing the explosive force of its release. Thus, the effect intensifies in a 'positive feedback' system. Over time, as the cracks may grow they sometimes form a sea cave. The broken pieces that fall off produce two additional types of erosion, abrasion (sandpapering) and attrition. In corrasion, the newly formed chunks are thrown against the rock face. Attrition is a similar effect caused by eroded particles after they fall to the sea bed where they are subjected to further wave action. In coastal areas wave hydraulic action is often the most important form of erosion.

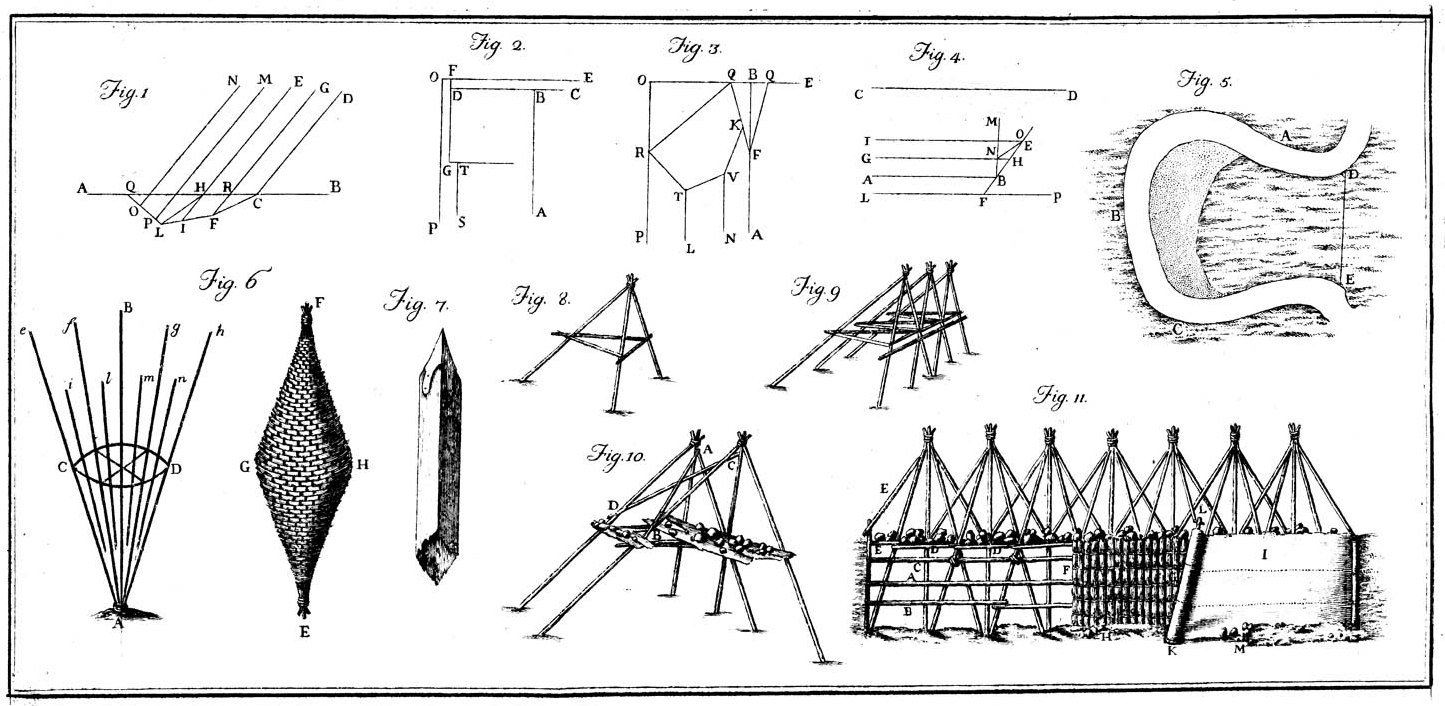
Tools to stem the erosion of rivers in the 18th century

Similarly, where hydraulic action is strong enough to loosen sediment along a stream bed and its banks; this will take rocks and particles from the banks and bed of the stream and add this to the stream's load. This process is the result of friction between the moving water and the static stream bed and banks. This friction increases with the speed of the water and once loosened the smaller particles are held in suspension by the force of the flowing water, these suspended particles can scour the sides and bottom of the stream. The scouring action produces distinctive markings on streams beds such as ripple marks, fluting, and crescent marks. The larger particles and even large rocks are scooted (dragged) along the bottom in a process known as traction which causes attrition, and are often "bounced" along in a process known as saltation where the force of the water temporarily lifts the rock particle which then crashes back into the bed dislodging other particles.

Hydraulic action also occurs as a stream tumbles over a waterfall to crash onto the rocks below. It usually leads to the formation of a plunge pool below the waterfall due in part to corrosion from the stream's load, but more to a scouring action as vortices form in the water as it escapes downstream. Hydraulic action can also cause the breakdown of river banks since there are water bubbles which enter the banks and collapse them when they expand.

== See also ==
- Freezing and thawing erosion
