= Frost weathering =

Mechanical weathering induced by freezing water

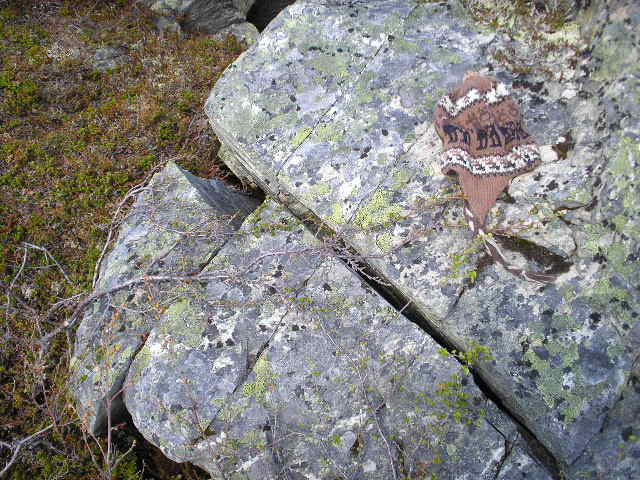
A rock in Abisko, Sweden, fractured (along existing joints) possibly by mechanical frost weathering or thermal stress (a chullo is shown for scale)

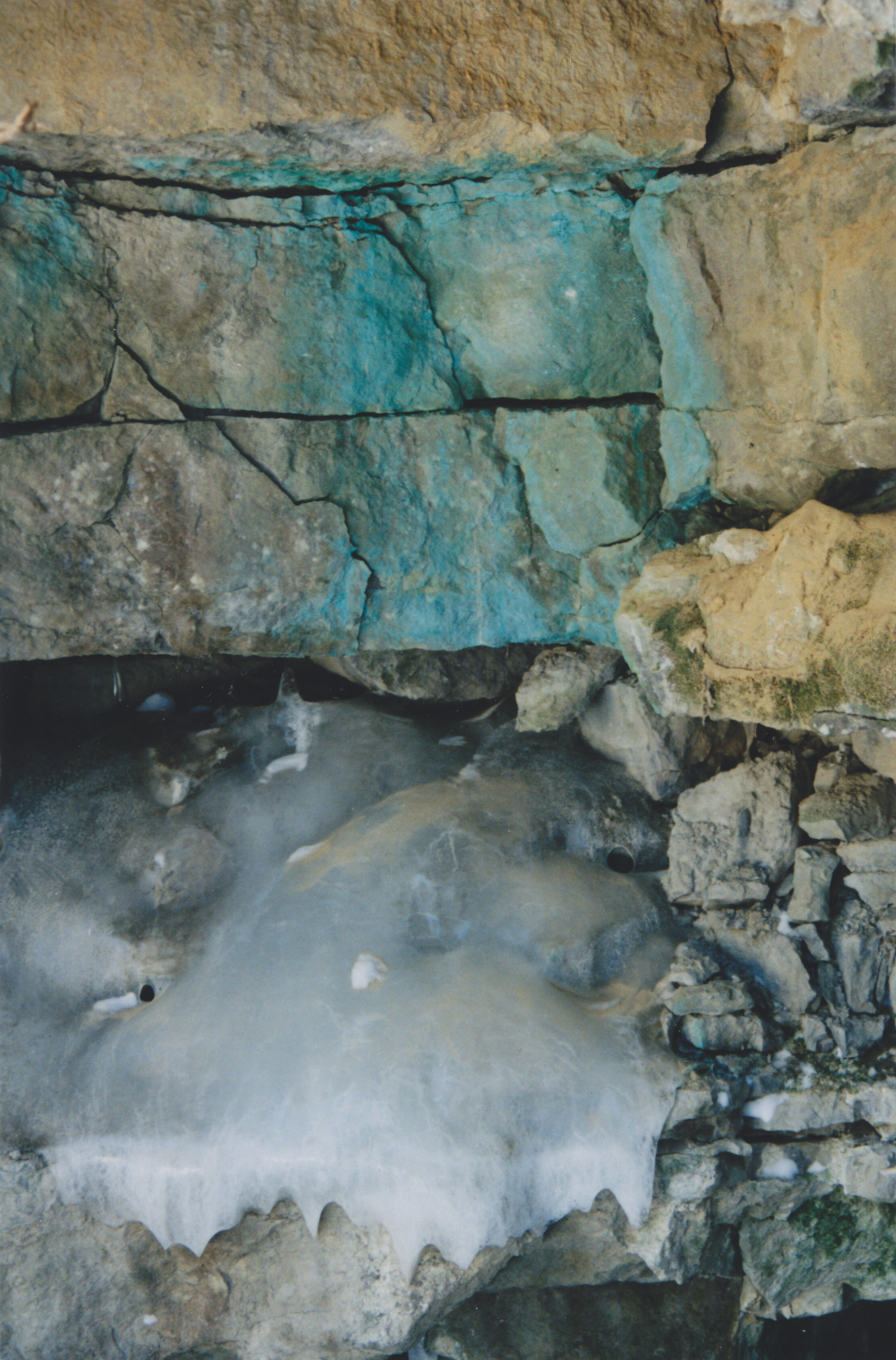
Rock face and downstream exit of the stream (Unnamed) of the cave of the Trou du Diable, Saint-Casimir, Quebec

Frost weathering is a collective term for several mechanical weathering processes induced by stresses created by the freezing of water into ice. The term serves as an umbrella term for a variety of processes, such as frost shattering, frost wedging, and cryofracturing. The process may act on a wide range of spatial and temporal scales, from minutes to years and from dislodging mineral grains to fracturing boulders. It is most pronounced in high-altitude and high-latitude areas and is especially associated with alpine, periglacial, subpolar maritime, and polar climates, but may occur anywhere at sub-freezing temperatures (between −3 and −8 °C (27 and 18 °F)) if water is present.

== Ice segregation ==
Certain frost-susceptible soils expand or heave upon freezing as a result of water migrating via capillary action to grow ice lenses near the freezing front. This same phenomenon occurs within pore spaces of rocks. The ice accumulations grow larger as they attract liquid water from the surrounding pores. The ice crystal growth weakens the rocks which, in time, break up. It is caused by the expansion of ice when water freezes, putting considerable stress on the walls of containment. This is actually a very common process in all humid, temperate areas where there is exposed rock, especially porous rocks like sandstone. Sand can often be found just under the faces of exposed sandstone where individual grains have been popped off, one by one. This process is often termed frost spalling. In fact, this is often the most important weathering process for exposed rock in many areas.

Similar processes can act on asphalt pavements, contributing to various forms of cracking and other distresses, which, when combined with traffic and the intrusion of water, accelerate rutting, the formation of potholes, and other forms of pavement roughness.

== Volumetric expansion ==
The traditional explanation for frost weathering was volumetric expansion of freezing water. When water freezes to ice, its volume increases by nine percent. Under specific circumstances, this expansion is able to displace or fracture rock. At a temperature of -22 °C, ice growth is known to be able to generate pressures of up to 207MPa, more than enough to fracture any rock. For frost weathering to occur by volumetric expansion, the rock must have almost no air that can be compressed to compensate for the expansion of ice, which means it has to be water-saturated and frozen quickly from all sides so that the water does not migrate away and the pressure is exerted on the rock. These conditions are considered unusual, restricting it to a process of importance within a few centimeters of a rock's surface and on larger existing water-filled joints in a process called ice wedging.

Not all volumetric expansion is caused by the pressure of the freezing water; it can be caused by stresses in water that remains unfrozen. When ice growth induces stresses in the pore water that breaks the rock, the result is called hydrofracture. Hydrofracturing is favoured by large interconnected pores or large hydraulic gradients in the rock. If there are small pores, a very quick freezing of water in parts of the rock may expel water, and if the water is expelled faster than it can migrate, pressure may rise, fracturing the rock.

Since research in physical weathering begun around 1900, volumetric expansion was, until the 1980s, held to be the predominant process behind frost weathering. This view was challenged in 1985 and 1986 publications by Walder and Hallet. Nowadays researchers such as Matsuoka and Murton consider the "conditions necessary for frost weathering by volumetric expansion" as unusual. However the bulk of recent literature demonstrates that that ice segregation is capable of providing quantitative models for common phenomena while the traditional, simplistic volumetric expansion does not.

== See also ==
- Hydrostatic pressure may also erode in combination with ice blocking outflow routes in mountain regions.
- Ice jacking – Structural damage caused by freezing water
- Pore water pressure – Pressure of groundwater held within a soil or rock, in gaps between particles
- Weathering
- Bratschen – Weathering products of certain rocks in the Alps
- Solifluction – Freeze-thaw mass wasting slope processes
