= Chesapeake Bay National Estuarine Research Reserve =

There are two National Estuarine Research Reserves called Chesapeake Bay National Estuarine Research Reserve in the United States:

- Chesapeake Bay National Estuarine Research Reserve (Maryland)
- Chesapeake Bay National Estuarine Research Reserve (Virginia)
