= Wind energy policy of the United States =

Modern United States wind energy policy coincided with the beginning of modern wind industry of the United States, which began in the early 1980s with the arrival of utility-scale wind turbines in California at the Altamont Pass wind farm. Since then, the industry has had to endure the financial uncertainties caused by a highly fluctuating tax incentive program. Because these early wind projects were fuelled by investment tax credits based on installation rather than performance, they were plagued with issues of low productivity and equipment reliability. Those investment tax credits expired in 1986, which forced investors to focus on improving the reliability and efficiency of their turbines. The 1990s saw rise to a new type of tax credit, the production tax credit, which propelled technological improvements to the wind turbine even further by encouraging investors to focus on electricity output rather than installation.

Wind energy policy is generally directed at three categories of constituents:

1. Research and Development Organizations
2. Commercial/Residential Generators
3. Manufacturers and Producers

with one of two goals:

1. to provide incentives or require production and installation of wind turbines or production of electricity from wind, or
2. facilitate the appropriate location of wind turbines.

Historically, incentives have come in the form of production or installation tax credits, grants, and renewable portfolio standards, at the federal, state, and local levels of government. Policy facilitating appropriate location has historically come in the form of local ordinances and permitting requirements.

== Background ==
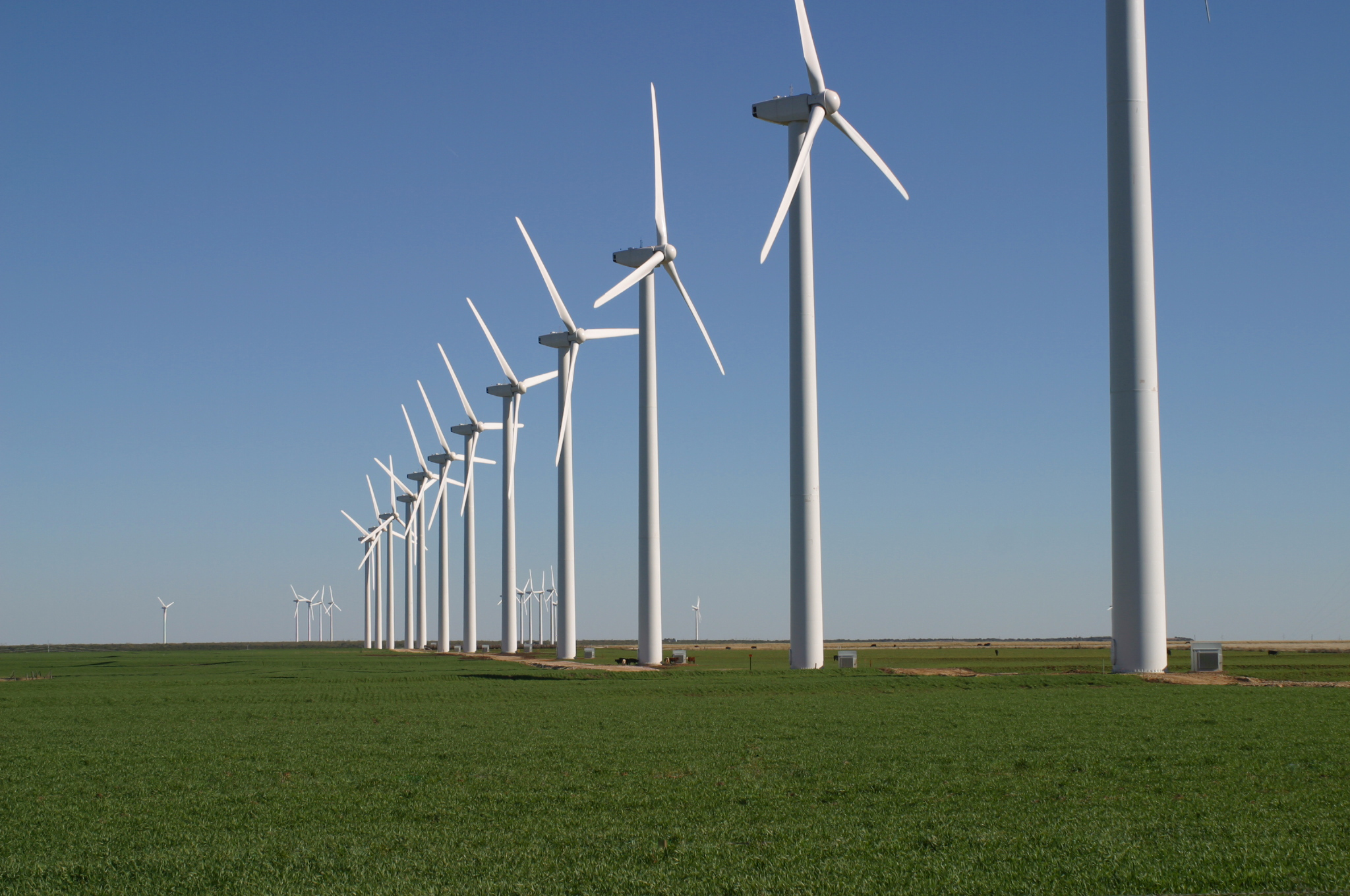
Brazos Wind Farm in Texas

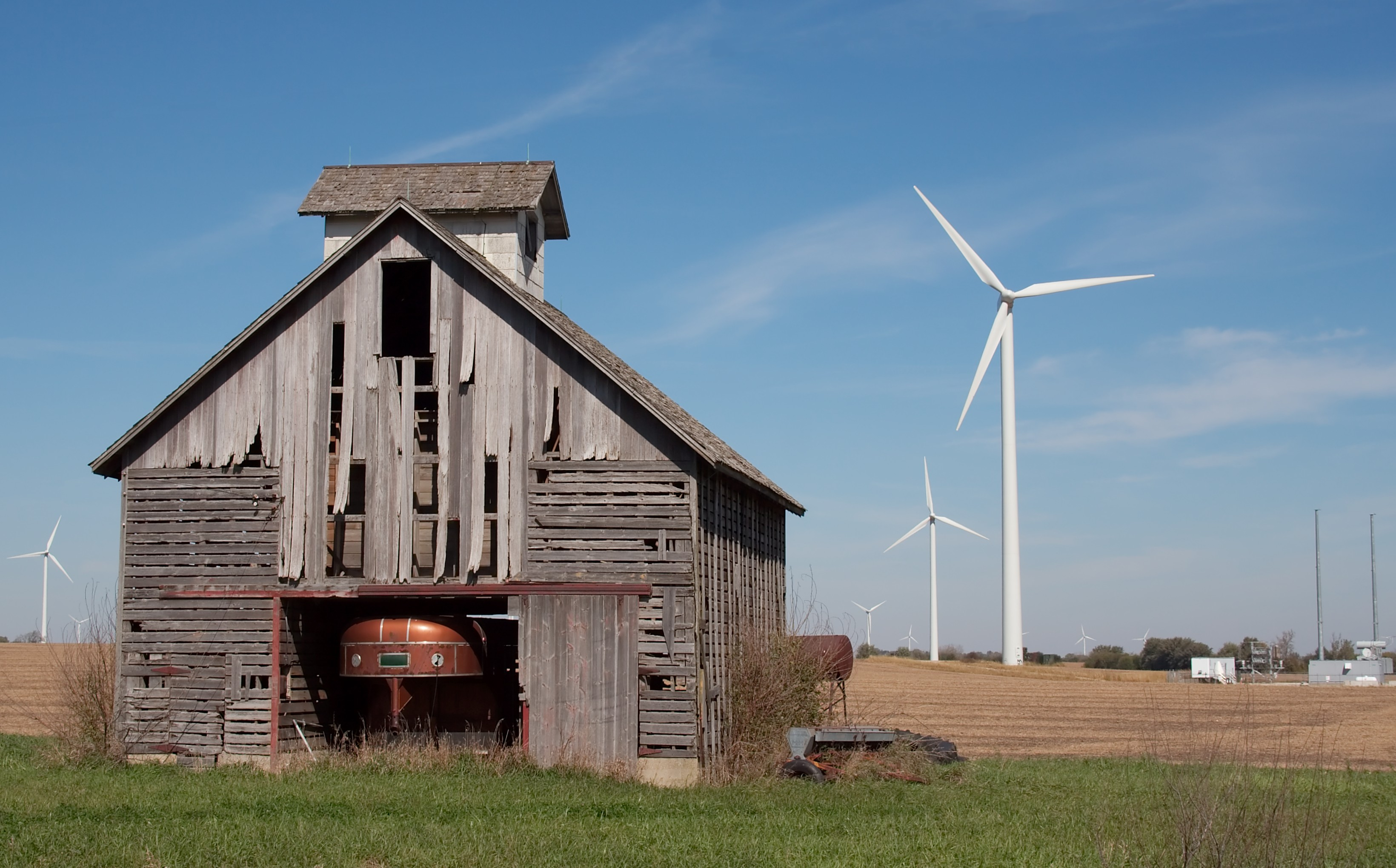
Mendota Hills Wind Farm in northern Illinois

Wind power is a branch of the energy industry that has expanded quickly in the United States over the last several years. In 2025, 464.4 terawatt-hours were generated by wind power, or 10.48% of electricity in the United States. The average wind turbine generates enough electricity in 46 minutes to power the average American home for one month. In 2019, wind power surpassed hydroelectric power as the largest renewable energy source in the U.S. In March and April of 2024, electricity generation from wind exceeded generation from coal, once the dominant source of U.S. electricity, for an extended period for the first time. The federal government and many state governments have policies that guide and support the development of the industry, including tax credits and renewable portfolio standards.

As of December 2023, the total installed wind power nameplate generating capacity in the United States was 147,500 megawatts (MW), up from 141,300 megawatts (MW) in January 2023, although total energy generation declined slightly due to weather conditions. This capacity is exceeded only by China and the European Union. Thus far, wind power's largest growth in capacity was in 2020, when 16,913 MW of wind power was installed. Following behind it were 2021, during which 13,365 MW were installed, and 2012, which saw the addition of 11,895 MW, representing 26.5% of new power capacity installed in 2012.

By September 2019, 19 states had over 1,000 MW of installed capacity with five states, Texas, Iowa, Oklahoma, Kansas, and California, generating over half of all wind energy in the nation. Texas, with 39,450 MW of capacity generating about 25% of the state's total electricity in 2024, has had the most installed wind power capacity of any U.S. state for more than a decade. The state generating the highest percentage of energy from wind power is Iowa, at over 57% of total energy production. North Dakota currently has the most per capita wind generation.

The Alta Wind Energy Center in California is currently the largest completed wind farm in the United States with a capacity of 1,548 MW. When completed in 2026, SunZia Wind in Central New Mexico, will be the largest wind farm in the western hemisphere, with over 900 turbines and a generating capacity of 3,500 MW. GE Power is the largest domestic wind turbine manufacturer.

Many projects to develop wind farms have been held up by new regulations and a slowed federal permitting process by the Trump administration, which is encouraging the use of fossil fuels.

== United States Energy Legislative History ==
Renewable energy policy gained interest after the oil shocks in the 1970s and environmental concerns because it offered diversification in the US energy portfolio Energy Policy and Conservation Act (P.L. 94-163). Wind energy was among the renewable energy options incorporated in energy policy beginning in the 1970s and continuing into the present day. The growth in wind energy can largely be accredited to the public policy's providing incentives and technological advances, making wind energy one of the few cost competitive renewable energy options. Although there has been a significant decrease in the cost per kilowatt hour of wind energy since the 1980s, wind energy only accounts for a small portion of the U.S.'s electrical demand.

Wind energy policy has had two approaches to advance the industry. One approach has been to increase implementation or improve the technology. Alternatively, there has also been policy aimed to advance the entire industry as a whole, combining the implementation and technology. The legislative history outlines the public policy that has taken place starting the 1970s leading up to current energy legislation and what effects it has made on renewable energy, specifically wind.

=== Energy Policy and Conservation Act 1975 ===
Signed into law in 1975 by President Gerald Ford, this act was designed to cut the energy demand. Although this act primarily enacted because of oil shocks in the 1970s, it also encouraged programs, research and projects which dealt with alternative fuels. The Secretary of Energy was instructed to report feasibility and progress on this matter to Congress.

=== Public Utility Regulatory Policies Act 1978 ===
The Public Utility Regulatory Policies Act (PURPA P.L. 95-617) passed in 1978 was very important to increasing electricity production from renewable energy facilities. PURPA required that electric utilities must interconnect with renewable power production facilities. They then would have to buy that power at a price mandated by their state equal to avoided cost; avoided cost is the cost a utility escapes by purchasing this power, opposed to building a new plant, consisting of capital and operating costs of the forgone plant.

=== Renewable Energy and Energy Efficiency Technology Competitiveness Act 1989 ===
The purpose of the Renewable Energy and Energy Efficiency Competitiveness Act 1989 (P.L. 101-218) was to set specific goals for the U.S. on the matter of wind, photovoltaics, and solar thermal energy programs. For wind energy, the specific goals set include, "improving design methodologies and developing more reliable and efficient wind turbines to increase the cost competitiveness of wind energy. Research efforts shall emphasize: (i) activities that address near-term technical problems and assist private sector exploitation of market opportunities of the wind energy industry; (ii) developing technologies such as advanced airfoils and variable speed generators to increase wind turbine output and reduce maintenance costs by decreasing structural stress and fatigue;(iii) increasing the basic knowledge of aerodynamics, structural dynamics, fatigue, and electrical systems interactions as applied to wind energy technology; and (iv) improving the compatibility of electricity produced from wind farms with conventional utility needs."

The legislation continues by specifying goals for the Wind Energy Research Program, "(i) reduce average wind energy costs to 3 to 5 cents per kilowatt hour by 1995;(ii) reduce capital costs of new wind energy systems to $500 to $750 per kilowatt of installed capacity by 1995; (iii) reduce operation and maintenance costs for wind energy systems to less than one cent per kilowatt hour by 1995; and(iv) increase capacity factors for new wind energy systems to 25 to 35 percent by 1995."

=== Solar, Wind, Waste, and Geothermal Power Production Incentives Act 1990 ===
This act is an amendment to the Public Utility Regulatory Policies Act (PURPA) of 1978 and the Federal Power Act. The main purpose is the remove the size limitations placed on renewable energy facilities, such as solar and wind, to receive PURPA benefits. This will encourage the development of renewable energy production. The act specifies the qualification, application, and construction deadlines and requirements for the facilities. The act was amended in 1991, because of a technicality, to include renewable energy facilities of all sizes.

=== Energy Policy Act (EPACT) 1992 ===
The Energy Policy Act of 1992 (P.L. 102-486) replaced the National Energy Conservation Act (NECPA) and focused on the following issues: water conservation, Federal energy efficiency fund, utility incentive programs, financial incentive program, demonstration of new technology, general services administration Federal building fund, energy savings performance contracts, energy audit teams, energy-efficient product procurement, U.S. Postal Service and Congressional building regulations, and fleet management.

Title XII of this Act directly discusses renewable energy and amends the Renewable Energy and Efficiency Technology Competitiveness Act of 1989 by, "(1) implement a five-year program to further the commercialization of renewable energy and energy efficiency technologies by soliciting proposals for demonstration and commercial application projects; and (2) establish an Advisory Committee on Demonstration and Commercial Application of Renewable Energy and Energy Efficiency Technologies."

It further instructs the Secretary to, "(1) prepare and submit to the Congress a three-year national renewable energy and energy efficiency management plan with specified contents; (2) establish a renewable energy export technology training program for individuals from developing countries; (3) make Renewable Energy Advancement Awards in recognition of developments that advance the practical application of certain renewable energy technologies; and (4) study and report to the Congress on whether certain conventional taxation and ratemaking procedures result in economic barriers to, or incentives for, renewable energy power plants compared to conventional power plants."

==== Renewable Electricity Production Tax Credit ====
EPACT '92 enacted the renewable electricity production tax credit (PTC). The PTC is a corporate tax credit for several renewable sources including wind, which credited 1.5₡ per kWh for electricity produced by wind power. The PTC expired in July 1999 and has been expanded and extended several times through many different laws including the Job Creation and Worker Assistance Act of 2002 (P.L. 107-47), American Jobs Creation Act of 2004 (P.L. 108-357), Energy Policy Act of 2005 (P.L. 109-58) and several others. The PTC was extended by the American Recovery and Reinvestment Act of 2009 (P.L. 111-5) until the end of 2012, but was retroactively renewed at the end of 2013. The PTC has been a major incentive for wind power, and has helped to spur independent wind energy power producers. As part of the 2013 fiscal deal, "the PTC was extended for another year and the rules for it were changed."

==== Renewable Energy Production Incentive ====
EPACT '92 also established a federal performance based incentive for renewable energy, which includes wind energy. The Renewable Energy Production Incentive's (REPI) purpose is to give incentive payments for electricity generated and sold by new qualifying renewable energy sources. Eligible facilities could receive 1.5 cents per kilowatt-hour (kWh), in 1993 dollars, now adjusted for inflation to equal 2.3 cents per kilowatt-hour, for the first 10 years of operation. This incentives is to be in addition to the federal renewable energy production tax credit (PTC). This incentive's deadline is October 1, 2016 and applies only to electricity sold to another entity.

=== Energy Policy Act (EPACT) 2005 ===
EPACT 2005 (P.L. 109-58) addresses numerous energy management goals for Federal facilities. The act also makes amendments to the National Energy Conservation Policy Act (NECPA). Several issues it addresses include: metering and reporting, energy-efficient product procurement, energy savings performance contracts, building performance standards, renewable energy requirements, and alternative fuel use. The effect on wind energy is through the renewable energy requirements.

Renewable energy requirement

The Secretary of Energy shall, when technically and economically feasible, require the total electric energy consumed to be provided by renewable energy for the Federal government:

1. Not less than 3% from 2007–2009

2. Not less than 5% from 2010–2012

3. Not less than 7.5% from 2013 and beyond

Double credit must be given if the renewable energy is produced at a Federal facility, on Federal lands or Native American Lands.

A PV commercialization program must be established for Federal buildings and 20,000 solar energy systems must be installed in Federal buildings.

In order to meet these requirements, government agencies must submit an annual report to the Department of Energy. This must detail their progress towards meeting the standards as a part of their annual data reporting. The Secretary of Energy then must provide a report to Congress, using the agencies information.

=== Energy Independence and Security Act of 2007 (EISA 2007) ===
The Energy Independence and Security Act of 2007 (PL 110-140) had very few policy provisions with regards to the wind industry. The only major stipulation regarding wind is in section 656 of the act. It directs the DOE to set up a cost-shared Renewable Energy Innovation Manufacturing Partnership Program. This program would make awards to support research, development and demonstration of advanced manufacturing processes, materials and infrastructure for renewable energy technologies. Wind systems are one of the several alternative forms of energy equipment that are eligible for these rewards. This section sets further goals to increase domestic renewable energy production as well as to better coordinate federal state and private sector resources.

=== American Reinvestment and Recovery Act (ARRA) 2009 ===
Most recently, wind energy policy has continued through the American Recovery and Reinvestment Act of 2009 (P.L. 111-5), signed into law by President Obama. In terms of wind energy, five areas were advanced: 1. an extension was given for the federal production tax credit (PTC) until December 31, 2012; 2. wind energy facilities can make use of an investment tax credit (ITC) for certain property in substitution for PTC; 3. wind projects initiated in 2009 and 2010 can receive a 30% grant from the Treasury Department for the cost of the property; 4. general business credits were modified; 5. the 2009 bonus depreciation was extended. Qualifying for an ITC gives a credit of 30% on the cost of the property used for a wind facility. Cash grants eliminate the need for a partner to utilize tax credits. The carry back period was extended for the business credit, along with the bonus depreciation. Additional related incentives include 30% investment credits for manufacturers of renewable energy technologies, an increase in new clean renewable energy bonds to finance wind facilities, and funding towards advancing the electrical grid.

Along with these advancements in policy, $1.64 billion was allocated for renewable energy, with $93 million for wind energy projects. $45 million will go towards wind turbine drivetrain R&D and testing, $14 million for technology development, $24 million for wind power research and development, and $10 million for the National Wind Technology Center. Along with this funding the National Renewable Energy Laboratory (NREL) will receive more than $100 million from ARRA.

=== Additional PTC extensions ===
The PTC has been renewed and expanded several more times, with the American Taxpayer Relief Act of 2012 (H.R. 8, Sec. 407) in January 2013, the Tax Increase Prevention Act of 2014 (H.R. 5771, Sec. 155) in December 2014, and the Consolidated Appropriations Act, 2016 (H.R. 2029, Sec. 301) in December 2015.

== Wind Production Tax Credit (PTC) ==
Production Tax Credits (PTC) were a part of the Energy Policy Act of 1992 (102nd Congress H.R.776.ENR, abbreviated as EPACT92) and are intended for wind and bioenergy resources. The purpose of the Production Tax Credit is to support renewable energy based upon the environmental, economic, and energy security benefits that renewable energy resources can provide. Besides wind energy, the PTC also covers closed loop biomass, geothermal power, and half the rate for open loop biomass, hydropower, landfill gas, and municipal solid waste. The PTC provides a 2.2 cent per kilowatt-hour benefit for the first ten years of a renewable energy facility's operation. It is only available for wind energy equipment located within the United States and only if electricity produced is sold to an unrelated party. Any unused credits may be carried forward for up to 20 years following generation.

=== History of the Production Tax Credit ===
The Energy Policy Act of 1992 originally enacted the Production Tax Credit and the first lapse came in June 1999. The PTC was extended in December 1999 until December 31, 2001. Once again the PTC expired in December 2001 and was not enacted again until March 2002 where it was then extended for another two years. At the end of 2003 the PTC expired for a third time until a one-year extension was granted in October 2004. With the 2004 extension, former President George Bush included the Production Tax Credit within a group of tax incentives for businesses. The PTC was extended through 2005 and also expanded the different types of renewable energies that would be included under the bill. The Energy Policy Act of 2005 (H.R. 6) modified the credit and extended it through the end of 2007. In December 2006, the PTC was extended for another year by the Tax Relief and Health Care Act of 2006 (H.R. 6111). President Barack Obama extended the PTC by signing into law the American Recovery and Reinvestment Act of 2009 (H.R. 1). The Wind PTC was extended an additional two years, expiring the end of 2012, and was then extended as part of the fiscal cliff deal to expire at the end of 2013. In late 2015 authorities provided a 5-year PTC, unlike the usual 1- or 2-year, but phased out by 2020 at a rate of 20% per year. The House voted 316-113, while the Senate voted 65-33. Analysts expect 25 GW more wind power from 2016 to 2018. The Consolidated Appropriations Act, 2016 extended the expiration date for this tax credit to December 31, 2019, for wind facilities commencing construction, with a phase-down beginning for wind projects commencing construction after December 31, 2016. The Act extended the tax credit for other eligible renewable energy technologies commencing construction through December 31, 2016. The Act applies retroactively to January 1, 2015.

=== Impacts of Production Tax Credit ===
Annual US Wind Power Installations

The Production Tax Credit has been the primary incentive for wind energy and has been essential to the industry's research and development. Wind Power development in the United States has shown a great dependence on the PTC. The wind industry has experienced growth during the years leading up to the expiration of the PTC and a dramatic decrease in installed wind capacity in years where the PTC has lapsed. In 2003, 1687 MW of capacity were installed leading up to a lapse of the PTC in 2004. In 2004, only 400 MW of capacity were installed in the United States. With the PTC reinstated in 2005, 2431 MW of capacity were installed which was a record at the time for the United States. The PTC allowed for the United States to lead the world in wind power additions in 2005 and 2006 with 16% of the worldwide capacity being installed in 2006 coming from the United States. The planning and permitting process for wind energy can take up to two years. With short-term extensions of the PTC, big investments from companies for research and development are less likely to occur. The current trend of short-term extensions of the Production Tax Credit have led to a boom and bust cycle of short-term planning and low number of investments. As the PTC expires many investors hurry to finish projects thus producing smaller capacity installations and creating higher electricity costs. Longer term Production Tax Credit policy would stimulate low-cost wind development and establish a more stable policy for wind development. Having short-term extensions on the PTC can potentially slow wind development, raise costs, require a greater reliance on foreign manufacturing, produce transmission issues, and most importantly can reduce the amount of research and development of wind energy. The world energy council has estimated that new wind capacity worldwide will amount to $150 to $400 billion in new business over the next twenty years. The 2015 extension is expected to add $35 billion of investment for 20 Gigawatts of wind power. Similar figures are expected for solar power, and combined the PTCs have a value of $25 billion. $20 billion was spent on the PTC between 2005 and 2019.

=== Incentives of PTC ===
There are several incentives that go along with a Wind Production Tax Credit. The PTC provides a 2.1 cent per kilowatt-hour benefit for the first ten years of a renewable energy facility's operation. A second incentive of PTC is wind developers can receive a 30% Investment Tax Credit(ITC) in place of the Production Tax Credit. This only applied if the projects were placed in service between 2009 and 2013. Lastly, a third incentive of the Production Tax Credit is providing grants that cover up to 30% of the renewable energy projects. This program is under the Department of Treasury and was effective for wind projects that were placed in service in 2009-2010 or the construction is begun by 2010 and plans to be in service before 2013.

A March 2009 analysis by Mark Bollinger, et al. showed that projects that cost $1,500/kW or less are likely to receive more value from the PTC, while projects that cost more than $2,500/kW are likely to be better off with the ITC. The ITC will be maintained at 30% until 2019, when it will be ramped down to, and maintained at, 10% by 2022.

== State Policy ==
Wind energy policy is organized on a state level, creating and more competitive market for wind energy. State policies offer incentives and tax credits for both producers and consumers to make wind energy more affordable. Renewable Portfolio Standard (RPS) and state grant programs are also used to increase wind energy usage in the United States. By using these state incentives, the US can make better suited decisions for wind implementation based on the specific state climate policies. However many wind development projects are produced by private developers rather than publicly owned. It also displays state permitting and ordinance requirements, usually done on a county level, that are important to know before installing wind turbines.

== Tax Credits ==
Tax credits for renewable energy technology support the adoption of clean energy technologies by reducing net project costs to consumers, and encouraging market acceptance of clean energy practices. They offer personal financial incentives and property value financial incentives for investing in renewable energy technologies like wind power. They can be used to exempt wind energy equipment from sales taxes to reduce capital investment. They can also be used to reduce property taxes for wind power facilities, or to reduce federal income taxes for qualified tax-paying owners based on the capital investments incurred in wind project development.

According to the Department of Energy, tax credits are generally more valuable than an equivalent tax deduction. They reduce dollar-by-dollar as opposed to removing a percentage of a tax that is owed. Tax credits and incentives target and benefit manufacturers, purchasers, building operators, and customers, and they appear to be most effective when linked to other policies.

Below is a table that shows tax credits by state for wind development in the United States. For more information on wind policy see also Database of State Incentives for Renewables & Efficiency.

Table 1: Personal and property state tax credits for renewable energy taken from the Database of State Incentives for Renewables and Efficiency (DSIRE)

State	Tax Credits
Alaska	Local Option - Property Tax Exemption for Renewable Energy Systems (Property)
Arizona	Non-Residential Solar & Wind Tax Credit (Personal), Renewable Energy Production Tax Credit (Personal), Residential Solar and Wind Energy Systems Tax Credit, Energy Equipment Property Tax Exemption (Property), Property Tax Assessment for Renewable Energy Equipment (Property)
Colorado	Local Option - Property Tax Exemption for Renewable Energy Systems (Property), Property Tax Exemption for Residential Renewable Energy Equipment (Property), Renewable Energy Property Tax Assessment (Property)
Connecticut	Property Tax Exemption for Renewable Energy Systems (Property)
Georgia	Clean Energy Tax Credit (Personal)
Hawaii	Solar and Wind Energy Credit (Personal)
Idaho	Residential Alternative Energy Tax Deduction (Personal), Property Tax Exemption for Wind and Geothermal Energy Producers (Property)
Illinois	Commercial Wind Energy Property Valuation (Property)
Indiana	Renewable Energy Property Tax Exemption (Property)
Iowa	Renewable Energy Production Tax Credit (Personal), Local Option - Special Assessment of Wind Energy Devices (Property), Property Tax Exemption for Renewable Energy Systems (Property)
Kansas	Renewable Electricity Facility Tax Credit (Personal), Renewable Energy Property Tax Exemption (Property)
Kentucky	Renewable Energy Tax Credit (Personal)
Louisiana	Tax Credit for Solar and Wind Energy Systems on Residential Property (Personal)
Maryland	Clean Energy Production Tax Credit (Personal), Income Tax Credit for Green Building (Personal), Local Option - Property Tax Credit for High Performance Buildings (Property), Property Tax Exemption for Solar and Wind Energy Systems (Property)
Massachusetts	Residential Renewable Energy Income Tax Credit, Renewable Energy Property Tax Exemption (Property)
Michigan	Alternative Energy Personal Property Tax Exemption (Property)
Minnesota	Wind and Solar-Electric (PV) Systems Exemption (Property)
Montana	Alternative Energy Investment Tax Credit (Personal), Residential Alternative Energy System Tax Credit, Corporate Property Tax Reduction for New/Expanded Generating Facilities (Property), Generation Facility Corporate Tax Exemption (Property), Energy Systems Exemption (Property)
Nevada	Property Tax Abatement for Green Buildings (Property), Renewable Energy Producers Property Tax Abatement (Property), Renewable Energy Systems Property Tax Exemption (Property)
New Hampshire	Local Option - Property Tax Exemption for Renewable Energy (Property)
New Jersey	Assessment of Farmland Hosting Renewable Energy Systems (Property), Property Tax Exemption for Renewable Energy Systems (Property)
New York	Energy Conservation Improvements Property Tax Exemption (Property), Local Option - Solar, Wind & Biomass Energy Systems Exemption (Property)
New Mexico	Renewable Energy Production Tax Credit (Personal), Sustainable Building Tax Credit (Personal)
North Carolina	Renewable Energy Tax Credit (Personal)
North Dakota	Large Wind Property Tax Reduction (Property), Renewable Energy Property Tax Exemption (Property)
Ohio	Qualified Energy Property Tax Exemption for Projects 250 kW or Less (Property), Qualified Energy Property Tax Exemption for Projects over 250 kW (Payment in Lieu) (Property)
Oregon	Residential Energy Tax Credit, Renewable Energy Systems Exemption (Property)
Pennsylvania	Property Tax Assessment for Commercial Wind Farms" (Property)
Puerto Rico	Puerto Rico - Tax Deduction for Solar and Wind Energy Systems, Puerto Rico - Property Tax Exemption for Solar and Renewable Energy Equipment (Property)
Rhodes Island	Residential Renewable Energy Tax Credit (Personal), Local Option - Property Tax Exemption for Renewable Energy Systems (Property)
South Dakota	Large Commercial Wind Exemption and Alternative Taxes (Property), Renewable Energy System Exemption (Property), Small Commercial Wind Energy Property Tax Assessment (Property)
Tennessee	Wind Energy Systems Exemption (Property)
Texas	Renewable Energy Systems Property Tax Exemption (Property)
Utah	Renewable Energy Systems Tax Credit (Personal)
Vermont	Local Option - Property Tax Exemption (Property)
West Virginia	Special Assessment for Wind Energy Systems (Property)
Wisconsin	Solar and Wind Energy Equipment Exemption (Property)

== Renewable Portfolio Standards (RPS) ==
Renewable Portfolio Standards are written policy designed to require retail power suppliers to provide a certain minimum percentage of electricity, from a specific renewable power source, for a specified period of time. RPS programs are often used because of the energy, environmental, and economic benefits created by using renewable energy. RPS programs create market demand for renewable energy supplies by aiming to stimulate the energy market to make clean energy economically competitive with conventional forms of electric power. According to The Environmental Protection Agency in "Renewable Portfolio Standards: An Effective Policy to Support Clean Energy Supply", current states with RPS requirements mandate that 4% - 30% of electricity be generated from renewable sources by a specified date, however, Renewable Portfolio Standards can have multiple goals. Current RPS programs also include goals for local, regional, or global environmental benefits, local economic development, reducing the risks fossil fuel pricing, and advancing renewable energy technologies.

There are two types of Renewable Portfolio Standards: mandatory and voluntary. As stated before, mandatory markets require the electricity service providers a minimum amount of renewable energy in their electricity supply while voluntary electricity markets allow the consumer to choose to surpass required policy and reduce the environmental impact of their electricity use further than required. Mandatory RPS programs are rarely applied to municipal utilities which are usually self regulated, but rather to investor-owned utilities and electric service providers. Voluntary markets help create renewable energy capacity that exceeds what mandatory markets contribute nationwide.

According to the EPA, based on knowledge gained from states with successful Renewable Portfolio Standards, designing and implementing an effective RPS program relies heavily on: support of state government, facilitated discussions with important stakeholders focusing on an appropriate RPS design, clear goals and objectives, and designing a clear and easy-to-use accounting system for compliance. It is also important to conduct a mid-term performance review. This should be done to identify the causes for any delay in meeting the RPS targets, and to make program changes as needed to meet the original goals of the RPS. As of 2009 33 states including Washington DC had enacted successful Renewable Portfolio Standards, and currently there are 37. In 2003 RPS programs produced more than 2,300 megawatts (MW) of new renewable energy capacity. In February 2009, the Union of Concerned Scientists project stated that RPS will account for 76,750 megawatts (MW) of new renewable power by 2025.

Below is a table of the current states with Renewable Portfolio Standards. For more information on wind policy see also Database of State Incentives for Renewables & Efficiency.

Table 2: State Renewable Portfolio Standards for renewable energy from the Database of State Incentives for Renewables and Efficiency (DSIRE)

Arizona	RPS: 15% by 2025
California	RPS: 20% by 2010 and 33% by 2020
Colorado	RPS: Investor-owned utilities 30% by 2020, Electric cooperatives 10% by 2020, Municipal utilities serving more than 40,000 customers 10% by 2020
Connecticut	RPS: 27% by 2020
Delaware	RPS: 25% by compliance year 2025-2026
District of Columbia	RPS: 20% by 2020
Hawaii	RPS: 40% by 2030
Illinois	RPS: 25% by compliance year 2025 - 2026
Iowa	Alternative Energy Law (AEL): 105 MW of renewable generating capacity
Maine	RPS: Total: 40% by 2017, Class I (New Resources) 10% by 2017
Maryland	RPS: 20% by 2022
Massachusetts	RPS: Class I (New Resources) 15% of by 2020 and an additional 1% each year thereafter; Class II (Existing Resources) 7.1% in 2009 and thereafter (3.6% renewables and 3.5% waste-to-energy)
Michigan	RPS: All utilities: 10% by 2015
Minnesota	RPS: Xcel Energy 30% by 2020, Other utilities 25% by 2025, Renewables Portfolio Standard Xcel Energy Wind and Biomass Generation Mandate: 825 MW wind
Missouri	RPS: 15% by 2021
Montana	RPS: 15% by 2015
Nevada	RPS: 25% by 2025
New Hampshire	RPS: 23.8% by 2025
New Jersey	RPS: 22.5% by compliance year 2020-2021
New Mexico	RPS: Investor-owned utilities 20% by 2020; Rural electric cooperatives 10% by 2020
New York	RPS: 29% by 2015
North Carolina	Renewable Energy and Energy Efficiency Portfolio Standard: Investor-owned utilities 12.5% by 2021, Electric cooperatives, municipal utilities: 10% by 2018
North Dakota	Renewable and Recycled Energy Objective: 10% by 2015
Ohio	Alternative Energy Resource Standard: 25% alternative energy resources by 2025
Oklahoma	RPS: 15% by 2015
Oregon	RPS: Large utilities 25% by 2025, Small utilities 10% by 2025, Smallest utilities 5% by 2025
Pennsylvania	RPS: ~18% alternative energy resources by compliance year 2020-2021
Puerto Rico	RPS: 20% by 2035
Rhode Island	RPS: 16% by 2019
South Dakota	Renewable, Recycled and Conserved Energy Objective: 10% by 2015
Texas	RPS: 5,880 MW by 2015; goal of 10,000 MW by 2025
Utah	RPS: 20% of adjusted retail sales by 2025
Vermont	Sustainably Priced Energy Enterprise Development (SPEED) Goals: 20% by 2017
Virginia	Voluntary Renewable Energy Portfolio Goal: 15% of base year (2007) sales by 2025
Washington	RPS: 15% renewables by 2020 and all cost-effective conservation
West Virginia	Alternative and Renewable Energy Portfolio Standard: 25% alternative and renewable energy resources by 2025
Wisconsin	RPS: 10% by 2015

== Grant Programs ==
States offer a variety of grant programs to encourage the use and growth of renewable energy. Wind energy project grants are offered primarily for the use in the commercial, industrial, utility, education, and government sectors. Applying for grants offers consumers a way to ease the investments costs in wind development projects. They can also be used to support research and development. They are obtained by applying to the different state programs and are offered in the form of cash or tax credits. Grant programs offer a way to pay for large portions of wind project initial costs and help support a national renewable energy system to be less dependent on traditional energy sources, and to protect the environment from future harm.

Below is a table listing available grant programs for renewable energy development, including wind power, by state. For more information on wind policy see also Database of State Incentives for Renewables & Efficiency.

Table 3: State grant programs for renewable energy from the Database of State Incentives for Renewables and Efficiency (DSIRE)

Alaska	Alaska Energy Authority - Renewable Energy Grant Program
Colorado	New Energy Economic Development Grant Program
Connecticut	CCEF - On-Site Renewable DG Program
Delaware	Research and Development Grants, Technology and Demonstration Grants
Illinois	Illinois State Board of Education - School Energy Efficiency Grant Program
Maine	Voluntary Renewable Resources Grants
Massachusetts	DOER - Green Communities Grant Program, MassCEC - Commonwealth Wind Incentive Program - Commercial Wind Initiative Grant, MassCEC - Commonwealth Wind Incentive Program - Community-Scale Wind Initiative
Michigan	Energy Efficiency Grants
New Hampshire	Community Development Finance Authority - Enterprise Energy Fund (Grant)
North Carolina	North Carolina Green Business Fund
Oregon	Community Renewable Energy Feasibility Fund Program
Pennsylvania	DCED - Alternative and Clean Energy Program, DCED - High Performance Building Incentives Program, DCED - Wind and Geothermal Incentives Program, High Performance Green Schools Planning Grants, Pennsylvania Energy Development Authority (PEDA) - Grants, Small Business Advantage Grant Program
Rhode Island	RIEDC - Renewable Energy Fund Grants
Texas	Department of Rural Affairs - Renewable Energy Demonstration Pilot Program
Virgin Islands	U.S. Virgin Islands - Discretionary Grant Program
Wisconsin	Focus on Energy - Renewable Energy Grant Programs

== Permitting and ordinances ==
Wind power investors frequently encounter non-financial dilemmas in the wind energy development process, due to zoning ordinances and permits. Zoning was first implemented in the 1920s, and it is one form of a land-use law. According to the National Renewable Energy Laboratory, "having zoning requirements is the principle [sic] means for local governments to implement land-use planning". The intent of establishing zoning laws is that land-use choices and regulation be done at a local level, staying as close as possible to the property owners affected by the installation. However, according to the Database of State Incentives for Renewables and Efficiency, there are some states with permitting requirements and ordinances decided by state government.

Often established ordinances do not address technologies like wind turbines. They also frequently have height restrictions; typically structures built taller than 35 feet require special use permits. Wind turbines are rarely identified as an allowed use of property, therefore the development of a wind power system requires more than just a large investment. Projects often need permits to monitor environmental impacts such as soil erosion and sedimentation, as well. It is important to be aware of these requirements, and to look further into county policy when pursuing a wind project.

Below is a table of state policy for land use. For more information on wind policy see also Database of State Incentives for Renewables & Efficiency.

Table 4: State rules, regulations and policies for wind project development from the Database of State Incentives for Renewables and Efficiency (DSIRE)

California	California - County Wind Ordinance Standards
Delaware	Wind Access and Permitting Law
Illinois	Statewide Renewable Energy Setback Standards
Maine	Maine Model Wind Energy Facility Ordinance
Massachusetts	Model As-of Right Zoning Ordinance or Bylaw: Allowing Use of Wind Energy Facilities
Michigan	Model Ordinance for Wind Energy Systems
New Hampshire	New Hampshire - Standards for Municipal Small Wind Regulations and Small Wind Model Wind Ordinance
New Jersey	Solar and Wind Permitting Laws
New York	Guidance for Local Wind Energy Ordinances
North Carolina	North Carolina Model Wind Ordinance, Carteret County - Wind Energy System Ordinance
Oklahoma	Requirements for Wind Development
Oregon	Model Ordinance for Renewable Energy Projects
Pennsylvania	Model Wind Ordinance for Local Governments
South Dakota	Model Ordinance for Siting of Wind-Energy Systems
Wisconsin	Wisconsin - Wind Siting Rules and Model Small Wind Ordinance
Wyoming	Wyoming Wind Energy Permitting Law

== Environmental Impacts ==
The environmental impact of electricity generation from wind power is minor when compared to that of fossil fuel power. Wind power consumes no fuel, and emits no air pollution, unlike fossil fuels. Wind turbines have some of the lowest global warming potential per unit of electricity generated: far less greenhouse gas is emitted than for the average unit of electricity, so wind power helps limit climate change. Emissions from production of a turbine are recouped in less than a year of operation, as it replaces gas or coal power.

Onshore (on-land) wind farms can have a significant visual impact and impact on the landscape. Due to a very low surface power density and spacing requirements, wind farms typically need to be spread over more land than other power stations. Conflicts arise especially in scenic and culturally-important landscapes. Siting restrictions, such as setbacks, may be implemented to limit the impact. The land between the turbines and access roads can still be used for farming and grazing. Some wind farms are opposed for potentially spoiling protected scenic areas, archaeological landscapes and heritage sites.

Many wind turbine blades are made of fiberglass and some only had a lifetime of 10 to 20 years. Previously, there was no market for recycling these old blades, and they were commonly disposed of in landfills. Because blades are hollow, they take up a large volume compared to their mass. Since 2019, some landfill operators have begun requiring blades to be crushed before being landfilled. Blade end-of-life is complicated, and blades manufactured in the 2020s are more likely to be designed to be completely recyclable.

Wind turbines also generate noise. At a distance of 300 metres (980 ft) this may be around 45 dB, which is slightly louder than a refrigerator. At 1.5 km (1 mi) distance they become inaudible. Some people who live very close to wind turbines have reported negative health effects, but peer-reviewed research has generally not supported these claims. Pile-driving to construct non-floating wind farms is noisy underwater, but in operation offshore wind is much quieter than ships.

Habitat loss and fragmentation are the greatest potential impacts on wildlife of onshore wind farms, but the worldwide ecological impact is minimal. Thousands of birds and bats, including rare species, have been killed by wind turbine blades, though wind turbines are responsible for far fewer bird deaths than fossil-fueled power stations when climate change effects are included. The effects of wind turbines on birds can be mitigated with proper wildlife monitoring.

== Transmission ==
The electric transmission grid in the United States is an aging infrastructure that poses limitations for new wind development that includes limited geographic access and capacity, scheduling difficulties, and delays in interconnecting.

Because much of the nation's most promising wind resources are located in remote regions of the country, locating access to existing transmission lines is often a challenge. Investment in new transmission infrastructure is a costly and often economically unfeasible prospect. The expense of constructing new transmission access is such a high barrier to market entry that private companies have begun investing in transmission infrastructure with the hope of lowering the cost of new wind projects (see Atlantic Wind Connection).

Congestion in existing lines also presents a threat to new wind facilities. Requests for transmission are often denied due to congestion. In 2006, the North American Electric Reliability Corporation reported 2,397 transmission request denials. The high frequency of transmission congestion also leads to long interconnection queues that are a required part of the development process.

The intermittent nature of wind power has conflicted with the original policies placed on power generators. Under these policies, electricity generators would be charged economic penalties if they did not meet their promised quotas. Because wind facilities do not have full control over the times and quantities of their electricity output, the Federal Energy Regulatory Commission (FERC) issued Order No. 890 to reform these generator imbalance charges.

== United States offshore wind policy ==
The framework for offshore wind policy in the United States has been shaped since the late 1800s. Though not directly associated, the first policy regulation was stated in the Rivers and Harbors Act of 1899, where the United States Army Corps of Engineers had authority over any construction in federal waters. It wasn't until 2005 that the authority changed, when the Energy Policy Act of 2005(Pub.L. 109-58) was enacted, and established the Secretary of the Interior to administer the federal water, within the federal regulatory agency of the Bureau of Ocean Energy Management (BOEM), previously known as the Minerals Management Service (MMS). The agency is "responsible for overseeing the safe and environmentally responsible development of energy and mineral resources on the Outer Continental Shelf.". Other policies that have affected offshore wind development in federal waters include the Outer Continental Shelf Lands Act (43 U.S.C. 1337), and the National Environmental Policy Act(NEPA) (42 U.S.C. 4321-4347). The only policy in state waters is the Coastal Zone Management Act of 1972 (Pub.L. 92-583).

=== History ===
The first offshore wind project in the U.S. was proposed in 2001 by Cape Wind. The United States Army Corps of Engineers assumed the lead federal regulatory role under the Rivers and Harbors Act of 1899, and issued a draft Environmental Impact Statement (EIS) in 2004. In 2004, the United States Department of Energy (DOE) produced "A Framework for Offshore Wind Energy Development in the United States. The report explored the potential and feasibility for installing wind turbines off the Mid Atlantic Coast, Gulf Coast, and in the Great Lakes. The framework also discusses in great detail the major challenges that would lie ahead such as technology development, environmental compatibility, economic financial viability, regulation and government policies, and leadership coordination.

Following the Energy Policy Act of 2005 (Public Law 109-58), the Bureau of Ocean Energy Management, Regulation and Enforcement (BOEMRE), assumed lead federal responsibility and initiated its own independent environmental review pursuant to the National Environmental Policy Act (NEPA). While the DOE focused on onshore wind development, several coastal states launched significant initiatives to attract, incentivize, and plan for wind development offshore. In 2009, the U.S. Offshore Wind Collaborative (USOWC) released the paper " U.S. Offshore Wind Energy: A Path Forward". This document presents a snapshot of U.S. offshore wind energy and serves as a resource for government, industry, and non-governmental stakeholders.

On October 6, 2010 the United States Department of the Interior Secretary Ken Salazar and Cape Wind Associates President Jim Gordon signed the nation's first lease for commercial wind energy development on the Outer Continental Shelf (OCS). On February 7, 2011, Energy Secretary Chu announced A National Offshore Wind Strategy. The strategy comes with $50 million of funding to be dispersed to technology development, removing market barriers, and next generation drivetrain. The new strategy will pursue offshore opportunities in both federal and state waters.

BOEM has held several auctions for offshore leases beginning in 2013. The first (3.6 GW) went to Deepwater Wind near Massachusetts and Rhode Island, the second (2 GW) went to Dominion Virginia Power 23 miles off the Virginia coast, and the third (1.45 GW) went to US Wind 10 miles off the coast of Ocean City, Maryland.

== Policies ==
=== State Permitting ===
Offshore wind energy projects in state waters are subject to permitting based on the Coastal Zone Management Plans established in each state. The majority of states operate under parallel agencies that provide policy regulation. Wind projects that would stretch between coastal states would require permitting consistent within each states coastal plan. Permitting discrepancies for such projects may arise causing lengthy delays in construction of offshore wind farms.

==== Coastal Zone Management Act (CZMA) ====
The Coastal Zone Management Act of 1972 (Pub.L. 92-583, 86 Stat. 1280, enacted October 27, 1972, 16 U.S.C. §§ 1451–1464, Chapter 33) (see Coastal Zone Management Act) was enacted in an effort to encourage states to establish coastal zone management plans. The plans would focus on preservation through protecting wildlife and natural resources. Each state program must allocate preservation measures and permitted uses for land and water resources. The Act was amended through the Energy Policy Act of 2005 to investigate the most recent issues that face the coastal land and waters. Congress listed several findings, including "a national objective of attaining a greater degree of energy self sufficiency through expanding energy activity in the coastal region."

=== Federal Permitting ===
Offshore wind energy projects in federal waters are subject to permitting based on lease agreements given by the Secretary of the Department of the Interior with BOEMRE. The President announced on April 22, 2009 that the Interior Department completed the Final Renewable Energy Framework to govern management of the Renewable Energy Program. "The final rule establishes a program to grant leases, easements, and rights-of-way for orderly, safe, and environmentally responsible renewable energy development activities, such as the sitting and construction of offshore wind farms on the OCS as well as other forms of renewable energy such as wave, current, and solar.".

==== Rivers & Harbors Act ====
The Rivers and Harbors Act of 1899 stated that the U.S. Army Corps of Engineers was the governing body for construction of any structure in federal waters. Any obstruction not approved by Congress would be prohibited from being constructed in any of the waters of the United States. The Chief of Engineers had to recommend any structures built and then gain approval from the Secretary of War. Although the Corps jurisdiction over offshore wind projects was never explicitly stated in the Act, Section 388 of the Energy Policy Act of 2005 sought out to clear up any misconceptions.

==== Energy Policy Act of 2005 ====
Section 388 of the Energy Policy Act of 2005 (Pub.L. 109-58) amends the Outer Continental Shelf Lands Act ((43 U.S.C. 1337)). The amendment states that the Secretary of the Interior may grant a lease, easement, or right-of-way on the outer Continental Shelf not otherwise stated in the Act. Offshore wind related projects could now be given leases at the disposal of the Secretary of the Interior within the federal regulating agency of BOEMRE. Prior to any lease agreements, all alternate energy projects must meet the standards of the National Environmental Policy Act.

==== National Environmental Policy Act ====
The National Environmental Policy Act of 1969 (42 U.S.C. 4321-4347) was enacted as the framework for environmental policy making in the U.S., with a goal of protecting, restoring, and enhancing the environment. The BOEMRE created documents for energy development planning to meet NEPA standards. They prepare Environmental Assessments (EA) to determine if there are environmental consequences for a potential offshore project, and also Categorical Exclusion Reviews (CER) to verify if and EA or an Environmental Impact Statement (EIS) is necessary in the first place.
