= Coastal hazards =

Coastal hazards are physical phenomena that expose a coastal area to the risk of property damage, loss of life, and environmental degradation. Rapid-onset hazards last a few minutes to several days and encompass significant cyclones accompanied by high-speed winds, waves, and surges or tsunamis created by submarine (undersea) earthquakes and landslides. Slow-onset hazards, such as erosion and gradual inundation, develop incrementally over extended periods.

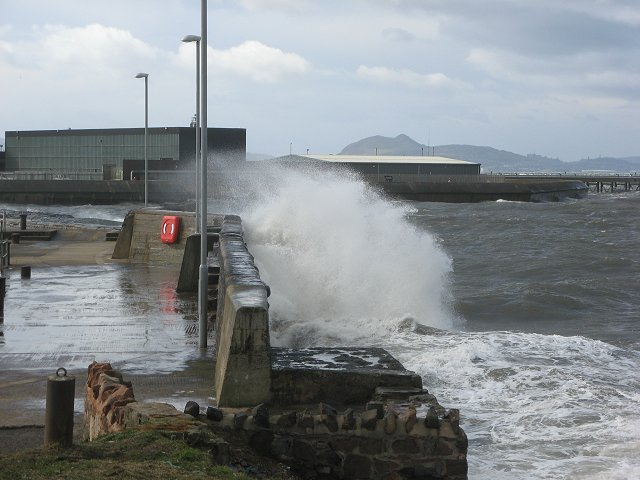
Cockenzie Harbor in a gale – geograph.org.uk – 370232

== Coastal environments of the US ==
There are many different types of environments along the coasts of the United States with very diverse features that affect, influence, and mold the near-shore processes that are involved. Understanding these ecosystems and environments can further advance the mitigating techniques and policy-making efforts against natural and man-made coastal hazards in these vulnerable areas. The five most common types of coastal zones range from the northern ice-pushing, mountainous coastline of Alaska and Maine, the barrier island coasts facing the Atlantic, the steep, cliff-back headlands along the Pacific coast, the marginal-sea type coastline of the Gulf region, and the coral reef coasts bordering Southern Florida and Hawaii.

Ice-pushing/mountainous coastline

These coastal regions along the northernmost part of the nation were affected predominantly by continuous tectonic activity, forming a very long, irregular, ridged, steep, and mostly mountainous coastline. These environments are heavily occupied with permafrost and glaciers, which are the two major conditions affecting Alaska's Coastal Development.

Barrier island coastline

Barrier islands are a landform system that consists of fairly narrow strips of sand running parallel to the mainland and play a significant role in mitigating storm surges and ocean swells as natural storm events occur. The morphology of the various types and sizes of barrier islands depends on wave energy, tidal range, basement controls, and sea level trends. The islands create multiple unique environments of wetland systems including marshes, estuaries, and lagoons.

Steep, cliff-backing abrasion coastline

The coastline along the western part of the nation consists of very steep cliffs and rock formations generally with vegetative slopes descending down with a fringing beach below. The various sedimentary, metamorphic, and volcanic rock formations assembled along a tectonically disturbed environment, all with altering resistances running perpendicular, cause the ridged, extensive stretch of uplifted cliffs that form the peninsulas, lagoons, and valleys.

Marginal-sea type coastline

The southern banks of the United States border the Gulf of Mexico, intersecting numerous rivers, forming many inlets bays, and lagoons along its coast, consisting of vast areas of marsh and wetlands. This region of landform is prone to natural disasters yet highly and continuously developed, with man-made structures used to address water flow and control.

Coral reef coastline

Coral reefs are located off the shores of southern Florida and Hawaii, consisting of rough and complex natural structures along the bottom of the ocean floor with extremely diverse ecosystems that absorb up to ninety percent of the energy dissipated from wind-generated waves. This process is a significant buffer for the inner-lying coastlines, naturally protecting and minimizing the impact of storm surges and direct wave damage. Because of the highly diverse ecosystems, these coral reefs not only provide shoreline protection but also deliver an abundance of services to fisheries and tourism, increasing their economic value.

== Causes of coastal hazards ==
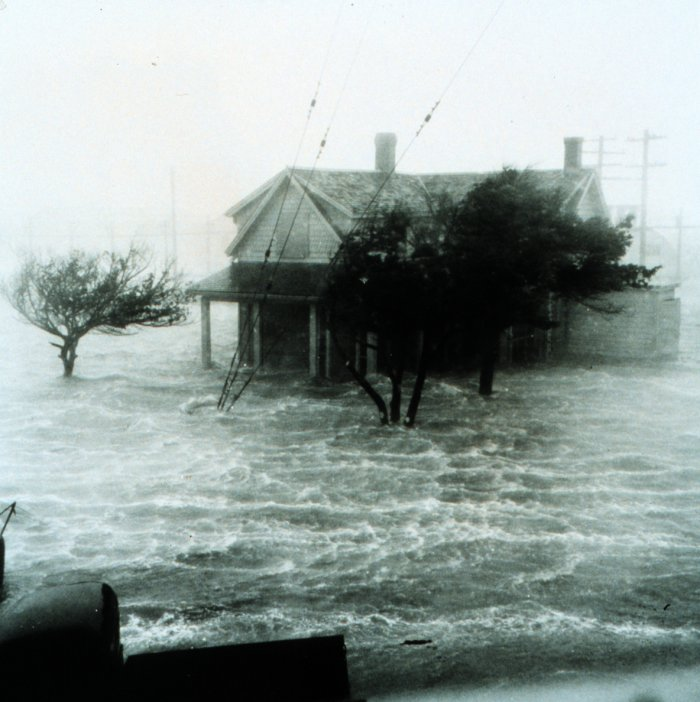
Hurricane Surge

Natural disasters vs. human disasters

The population that lives along or near coastlines is extremely vulnerable to coastal hazards. There are numerous issues that can threaten coastal ecosystems, with two main categories that these hazards can be placed under: Natural disasters and human disasters. Both of these issues cause great damage to coastlines and their communities, and discussion is still ongoing regarding what standards or responses need to be met to allow communities to continue living along coastlines while keeping them safe and preventing further coastal erosion. Natural disasters are events that are out of human control and are usually caused by weather. Such disasters include but are not limited to; storms, tsunamis, typhoons, flooding, tides, waterspouts, nor'easters, and storm surges. Human disasters are disasters that occur partially or fully due to human behavior, such as pollution, trawling, and human development.

Hazardous events in coastal areas affect millions of people. Around ten million people globally are affected by coastal problems yearly, with most of these due to certain natural hazards like coastal flooding with storm surges and typhoons. A major problem related to coastal regions deals with how the global environment is changing and the unique implications of this for coastal areas.

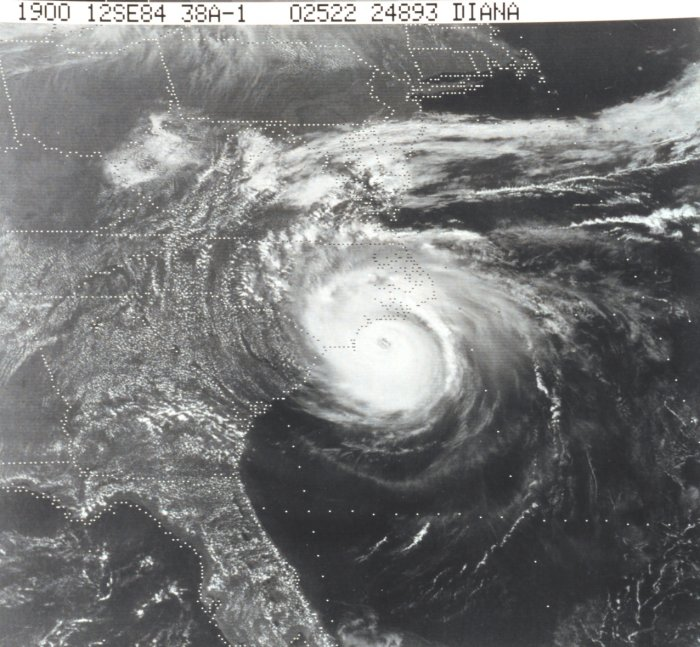
Hurricane Diana

Storms, flooding, and erosion

Storms are one of the major hazards that are associated with coastal regions. Storms, flooding, and erosion are closely associated and can happen simultaneously. Tropical storms or hurricanes especially can devastate coastal regions. For example, in 1992, Hurricane Andrew caused extreme damage to parts of the U.S. state of Florida. It was a category five hurricane that caused $26.5 billion in damages and led to 23 fatalities. Hurricane Katrina also caused havoc along the southern coast of the U.S. and is often cited as an example of the extreme force a hurricane can do in certain regions. The South Indian Chennai Floods of 2015, which affected many people, is an example of flooding due to cyclones. People across the whole state of Tamil Nadu and parts of Andhra Pradesh were affected by these floods. There was a loss of Rs 14,000 crore and over 500 lives.

In almost all cases, storms are the major culprit that causes flooding and erosion. Flash flooding is caused by massive amounts of rainfall during storms flowing down into an area over a short period of time. Storm surges, which are closely related to tropical storms, occur when wind collects and pushes water towards low pressure or inland, with this water sometimes rising rapidly. The amount of sea level rise or fall from a storm surge depends greatly on the amount and duration of wind and water in a specific location. During high tides, these surges can have an even greater effect on the coast.

Almost all storms with high wind and water cause erosion along the coast. Erosion can occur along shore currents due to tides, sea level rise and fall, and high winds. Larger amounts of erosion cause the coastline to degrade at a faster rate and can destroy areas of habitation, leaving less land to develop or preserve. Coastal erosion has been increasing over the past few years, and it is still on the rise, making it a major coastline hazard. In the United States, 45 percent of the coastline is along the Atlantic or Gulf coast, and the erosion rate per year along the Gulf coast is currently at six feet a year. The average rate of erosion along the Atlantic is around two to three feet a year. Even with these findings, erosion rates in specific locations vary because of various environmental factors such as significant storms that can cause major erosion upwards of 100 feet or more in only one day.

Pollution, trawling, and human development

North Carolina Homes being taken by the Atlantic Ocean 08-23-2011

Pollution, trawling, and human development are major human disasters that affect coastal regions. There are two main categories related to pollution, point source pollution, and nonpoint source pollution. Point source pollution is when there is an exact location such as a pipeline or a body of water that leads into the rivers and oceans. Known dumping into the ocean is also another point source of pollution. Nonpoint source pollution pertains more to fertilizer runoff, and industrial waste. Examples of pollution that affect the coastal regions include fertilizer runoff, oil spills, and dumping of hazardous materials into the oceans. Other human actions that damage coastlines are waste discharge, fishing, dredging, mining, and drilling. Oil spills are one of the most hazardous dangers to coastal communities. They are hard to contain, difficult to clean up and create widespread devastation to wildlife, water, and especially the coastline near spills. A recent spill that drew attention to the issue of oil spilling was the Deepwater Horizon oil spill in the Gulf of Mexico off the Louisiana coast.

Trawling hurts the normal ecosystems in the water around the coastline, including those of the ocean floor. This practice is when a giant net is dragged across the ocean floor, catching and even destroying anything in its path. Human development is one of the major problems when facing coastal hazards. The overall construction of buildings and houses on the coastline can remove natural barriers which handle the fluctuation in water and sea level rise. Building houses in pre-flood areas or high-risk areas that are extremely vulnerable to flooding are major concerns towards human development in coastal regions. Having houses and buildings in areas that are known to have powerful storms can pose a risk to the communities living there, such as on barrier islands, where land is at high risk for erosion. As a result, an increasing number of houses today are being taken by the ocean.

Coastal hazards and climate change

The predicted trajectory of climate change adds an extra risk factor to human settlement in coastal areas. Whereas the natural dynamics that shape our coastlines have been relatively stable and predictable over the last centuries, much more rapid change is now expected in processes such as sea level rise, ocean temperature and acidity, tropical storm intensity, and precipitation/runoff patterns. The world's coastlines will respond to these changes in different ways and at different pace depending on their bio-geophysical characteristics, and as such, past coastal trends often cannot be directly projected into the future. Instead, it is necessary to consider how different coastal environments will respond to the predicted climate change and take the expected future hazards into account in the coastal planning processes.

== Policies ==
National Flood Insurance Program

The National Flood Insurance Program or NFIP was instituted in 1968 and offers homeowners in qualifying communities an opportunity to rebuild and recover after flooding events following the decision by insurance companies to discontinue providing flood insurance. This decision was made on behalf of the private insurers after continually high and widespread flood losses. The goals of this program are to not only better protect individuals from flood, but to reduce property losses, and reduce the total amount disbursed for flood losses by the government. Only communities which have adopted and implemented mitigation policies that are compliant with or exceed federal regulations. The regulatory policies reduce risk to life and property located within floodplains. The NFIP also comprehensively mapped domestic floodplains increasing public awareness of risk. The majority of structures were constructed after the mapping was completed and risk could be assessed. To reduce the cost to these owners, which constitute roughly 25% of the total policies the rates for insurance are subsidized.

Coastal States Organization

The Coastal States Organization or COS was established in 1970 to represent 35 U.S. sub-federal governments on issues of coastal policies. CSO lobbies Congress on issues pertaining to Coastal Policy allowing states input on federal policy decisions. Funding, support, water quality, coastal hazards, and coastal zone management are the primary issues COS promotes. The strategic goals of COS are to provide information and assistance to members, evaluate and manage coastal needs, and secure long-term funding for member states initiatives.

Coastal Zone Management Act

In 1972 the Coastal Zone Management Act or CZMA works to streamline the policies that states create to a minimum federal standard for environmental protection. CZMA establishes the national policy for the development and implementation of regulatory programs for coastal land usage, which is supposed to be reflected in state legislation such as CAMA. CZMA also provides minimum building requirements to make the insurance provided through the NFIP less expensive for the government to operate by mitigating losses. Congress found that it was necessary to establish the minimum that programs should provide for. Each coastal state is required to have a program with 7 distinct parts: identifying land uses, identifying critical coastal areas, management measures, technical assistance, public participation, administrative coordination, and state coastal zone boundary modification.

The Coastal Area Management Act

The Coastal Area Management Act or CAMA is a policy that was implemented by the state of North Carolina in 1974 to work in tandem with the CZMA. It creates a cooperative program between the state and local governments. The State government operates in an advisory capacity and reviews decisions made by local government planners. The goal of this legislation was to create a management system capable of preserving the coastal environment, ensure the preservation of land and water resources, balance the use of coastal resources, and establish guidelines and standards for conservation, economic development, tourism, transportation, and the protection of common law.

-- Management and planning --

Due to the increasing urbanization along the coastlines, planning and management are essential to protecting the ecosystems and environment from depleting. Coastal management is becoming implemented more because of the movement of people to the shore and the hazards that come with the territory. Some of the hazards include the movement of barrier islands, sea level rise, hurricanes, nor'easters, earthquakes, flooding, erosion, pollution and human development along the coast. The Coastal Zone Management Act (CZMA) was created in 1972 because of the continued growth along the coast, this act introduced better management practices such as integrated coastal zone management, adaptive management and the use mitigation strategies when planning. According to the Coastal Zone Management Act, the objectives are to remain balanced to "preserve, protect, develop, and where possible, to restore or enhance the resources of the nation's coastal zone". The development of the land can strongly affect the sea, for example, the engineering of structures versus non-structures and the effects of erosion along the shore.

Integrated coastal zone management

Integrated coastal zone management means the integration of all aspects of the coastal zone; this includes environmentally, socially, culturally politically and economically to meet a sustainable balance all around. Sustainability is aimed at ensuring protection for the environment and human health. Coastal zones are fragile and do not do well with change, so it is important to acquire sustainable development. The integration from all views will entitle a holistic view for the best implementation and management of that country, region, and local scales. The five types of integration include integration among sectors, integration between land and water elements of the coastal zone, integration amount levels of government, integration between nations and integration among disciplines are all essential to meet the needs for implementation. Management practices include

1. maintaining the functional integrity of the coastal resource systems, without disrupting the environment
2. reducing resource-use conflicts, by making sure resources are used adequately and sustainably,
3. maintaining the health of the environment, which means to protect the ecosystems and natural cycle,
4. facilitating the progress of multisectoral development, which means allowing developers to develop within standards.

These four management practices should be based on a bottom-up approach, meaning the approach starts from a local level which is more intimate to the specific environment of that area. After assessment from the local level, the state and federal input can be implemented. The bottom-up approach is key for protecting the local environments because there is a diversity of environments that have specific needs all over the world.

Adaptive management

Managing Coastal Hazards Chart

Adaptive management is another practice of development adaptation to the environment. Resources are the major factor when managing adaptively to a certain environment to accommodate all the needs of development and ecosystems. Strategies used must be flexible by either passive or active adaptive management include these key features:

- Alternative decision-making (evaluating results and adjusting actions on the basis of what has been learned)
- Feedback between monitoring and decisions (learning process)
- Explicit characterization of system uncertainty through multi-model inference (experimentation)
- Embracing risk and uncertainty as a way of building understanding (trial and error)

To achieve adaptive management is testing the assumptions to achieve a desired outcome, such as trial and error, find the best-known strategy then monitoring it to adapt to the environment, and learning the outcomes of success and failures of a project.

Mitigation

Relocation of the Cape Hatteras Lighthouse, NC, Failure of groin to protect the coast

The purpose of mitigation is not only to minimize the loss of property damage but minimize environmental damages due to development. To avoid impacts by not taking or limiting actions, to reduce or rectify impacts by rehabilitation or restoring the affected environments or instituting long-term maintenance operations, and compensating for impacts by replacing or providing substitute environments for resources Structural mitigation is the current solution to eroding beaches and movement of sand is the use of engineered structures along the coast have been short-lived and are only an illusion of safety to the public that result in long term damage of the coastline. Structural management deals with the use of the following: groins which are man-made solutions to longshore current movements up and down the coast. The use of groins is efficient to some extent yet causes erosion and sand build-up further down the beaches. Bulkheads are man-made structures that help protect the homes built along the coast and other bodies of water that actually induce erosion in the long run. Jetties are structures built to protect sand movement into the inlets where boats for fishing and recreation move through. The use of nonstructural mitigation is the practice of using organic and soft structures for solutions to protect against coastal hazards. These include artificial dunes, which are used to create dunes that have been either developed on or eroded. There need to be at least two lines of dunes before any development can occur. Beach Nourishment is a major source of nonstructural mitigation to ensure that beaches are present for the communities and for the protection of the coastline. Vegetation is a key factor when protecting from erosion, specifically for to help stabilize dune erosion.

== See also ==
- Federal Emergency Management Agency
