= Valentin's Classification of Coastal Contexts =

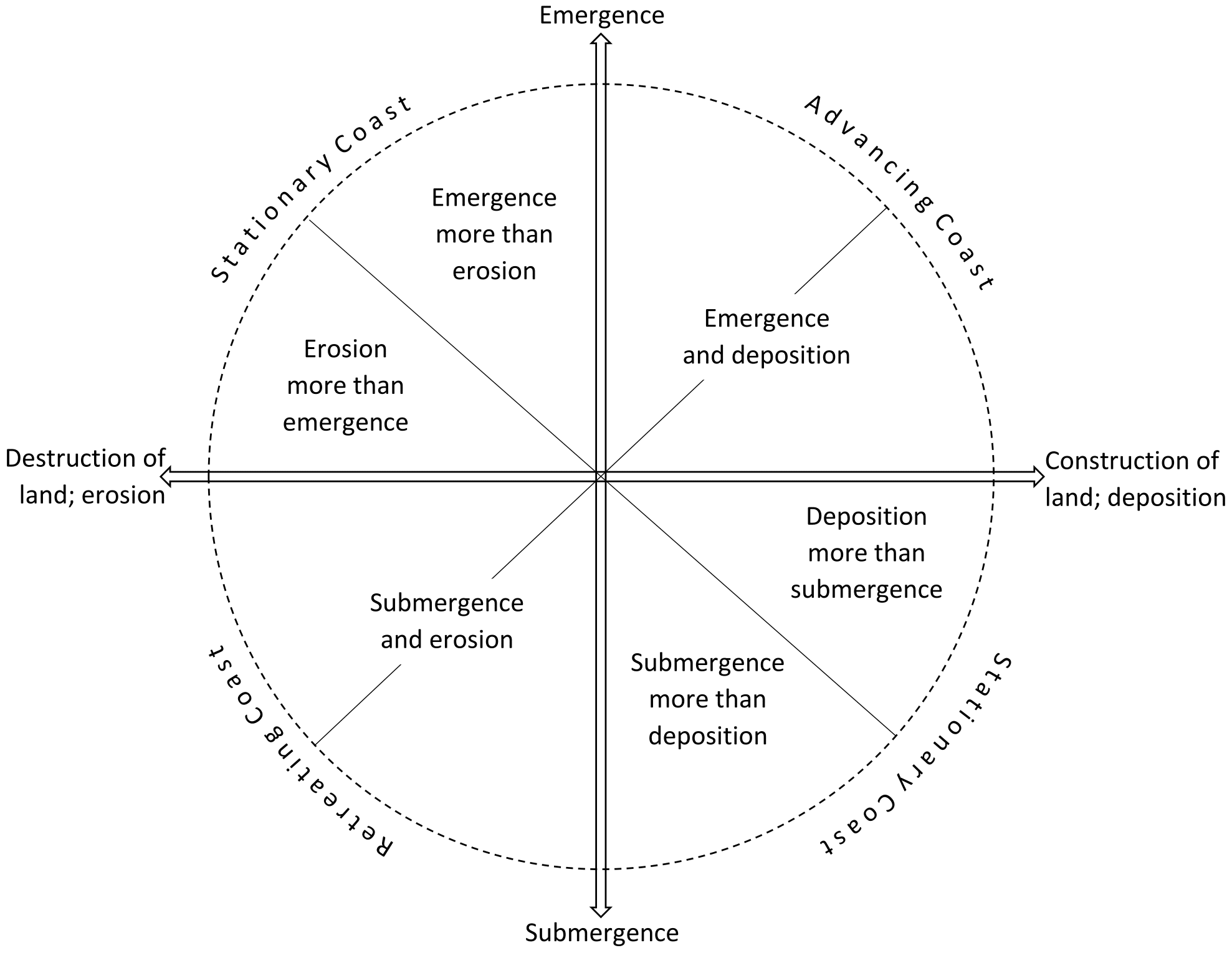
Valentin's Classification of Coastal Contexts

The Valentin's Classification of Coastal Contexts is a framework used in physical geography to classify coastlines by their primary processes. It recognises that coasts can be erosional or depositional and emergent or submergent and that these effects can magnify or neutralise each other. It was devised by German geographer Dr. Hartmut Valentin in 1953.
