= Kachemak Bay National Estuarine Research Reserve =

Protected area in Alaska, United States

Coordinates: 59.62°N 151.34°W

Kachemak Bay National Estuarine Research Reserve, on the western coast of the Kenai Peninsula in Alaska, is part of the National Estuarine Research Reserve System and is managed jointly by the U.S. National Oceanic and Atmospheric Administration and the Alaska Department of Fish and Game. Covering more than 370,000 acres (1,500 km^{2}), it is the largest reserve in the system, encompassing one of the most diverse and intensively used estuaries in Alaska. The local community pursued the designation of Kachemak Bay as a National Estuarine Research Reserve to preserve the lifestyle and economy of the region.

The boundary for Kachemak Bay NERR encompasses two state critical habitat areas or CHAs (Kachemak Bay Critical Habitat Area and Fox River Flats Critical Habitat Area), and two state parks (Kachemak Bay State Park and Kachemak Bay State Wilderness Park). The State CHAs comprise 923 square kilometres (228,000 acres) within the Reserve boundary (Kachemak Bay = 926 square kilometres or 229,000 acres; Fox River Flats = 27 square kilometres or 6,700 acres), while those areas of Kachemak Bay State Park, Alaska’s first state park, and Kachemak Bay State Wilderness Park, that fall within the Kachemak Bay watershed make up the remaining 554 square kilometres (137,000 acres).

In 2011, Alaska withdrew from participation in the Coastal Zone Management Program and hence no longer qualifies for grants under the Coastal and Estuarine Land Conservation Program, but the Kachemak Bay National Estuarine Research Reserve can still receive them.
