= Old Woman Creek National Estuarine Research Reserve =

Freshwater estuary in Ohio, US

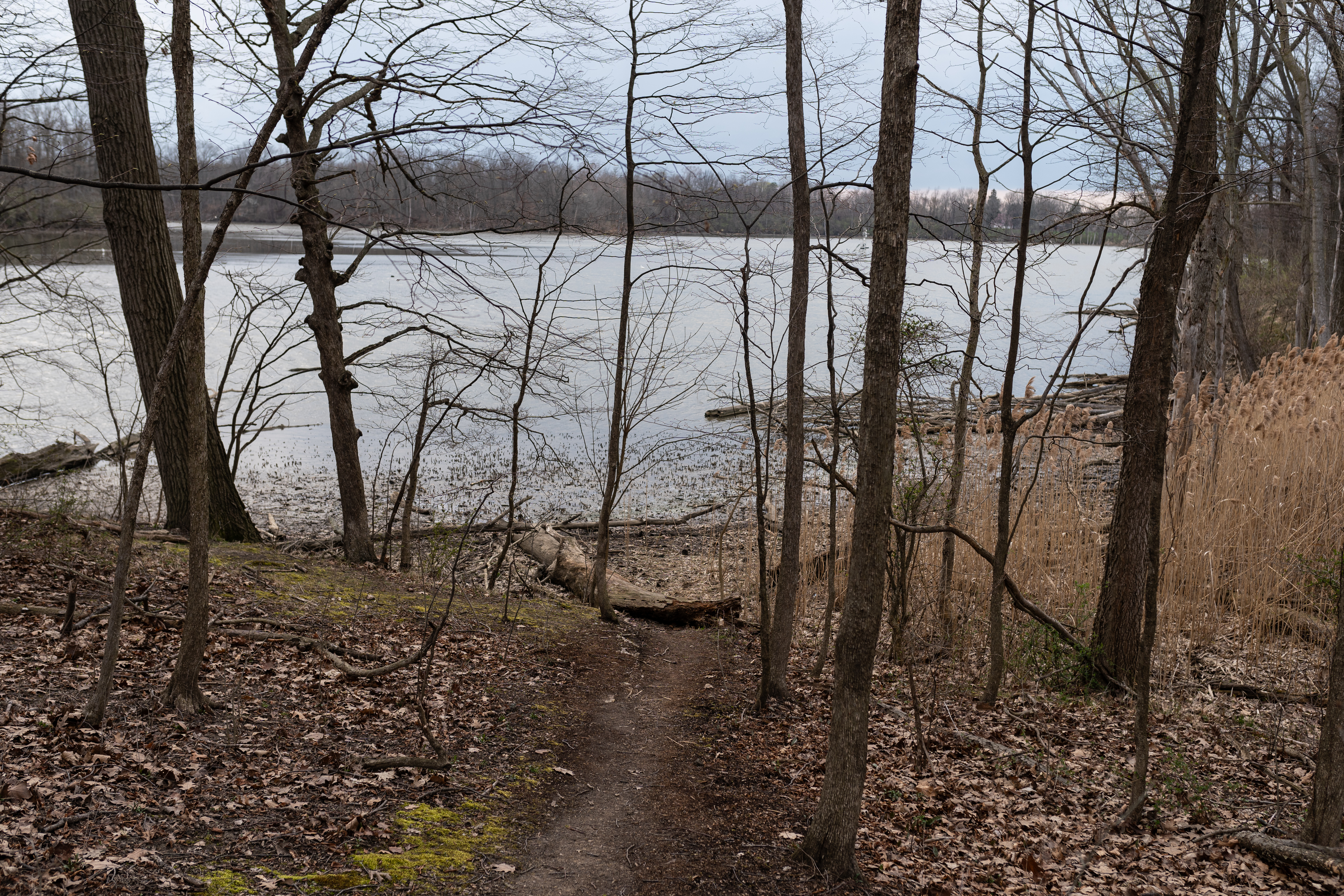
- The estuary in early spring

- Location within Ohio Location within the United States
- Location: Erie County, Ohio, USA
- Coordinates: 41°22′34″N 82°30′42″W
- Area: 573 acres (232 ha)
- Established: 1980
- Website: nerrs.noaa.gov/Reserve.aspx?ResID=OWC

Old Woman Creek National Estuarine Research Reserve is the smallest reserve in the National Estuarine Research Reserve System at 573 acres (232 ha). It is one of two Great Lakes-type, freshwater estuaries in the system; the other being Lake Superior National Estuarine Research Reserve. Located in Erie County, Ohio near Sandusky, the reserve features freshwater marshes, swamp forests, a barrier beach, upland forest, estuarine waters, stream and nearshore Lake Erie. Photographic atlases containing descriptions and identifications of many of the invertebrates found at Old Woman Creek have been prepared by Dr. Kenneth Krieger of the National Center for Water Quality Research at Heidelberg University.

== Ecology and Habitats ==
The Old Woman Creek National Estuarine Research Reserve protects one of the few remaining natural freshwater estuaries on the Great Lakes. The 573-acre site lies along the south-central shore of Lake Erie near Huron, Ohio, where Old Woman Creek enters the lake. Habitats within the reserve include freshwater marsh, swamp forest, upland oak-hickory woodlands, riparian stream corridors, and a narrow barrier beach separating the estuary from the open lake. The estuary serves as a transition zone between river and lake environments, supporting aquatic vegetation such as American water lotus (*Nelumbo lutea*) and coontail (*Ceratophyllum demersum*), along with diverse fish, amphibian, and bird populations.

== Research, Education, and Stewardship ==
Designated in 1980, the reserve is jointly managed by the National Oceanic and Atmospheric Administration (NOAA) and the Ohio Department of Natural Resources as part of the National Estuarine Research Reserve System (NERRS). The site functions as a living laboratory for long-term ecological research and environmental monitoring. Programs at Old Woman Creek focus on nutrient cycling, carbon storage, hydrological dynamics, and the effects of land use on water quality. The on-site visitor and research center includes classrooms, laboratories, and interpretive exhibits, supporting public education, teacher training, and citizen-science activities.

== Conservation Significance ==
Over 90 percent of Ohio’s original coastal wetlands have been lost to drainage and development, making Old Woman Creek one of the last intact examples of a naturally functioning Great Lakes estuary. The reserve plays a key role in protecting water quality, reducing nutrient loads entering Lake Erie, and providing breeding and migratory habitat for fish and waterfowl. Ongoing management addresses challenges such as fluctuating lake levels, invasive species, sedimentation, and watershed development pressures.
