= Connecticut National Estuarine Research Reserve =

Protected area in Connecticut, US

Coordinates: 41.277°N 72.208°W

The Connecticut National Estuarine Research Reserve is one of 30 reserves established as part of the National Estuarine Research Reserve System. It was designated in 2022 to protect 52,160 acres of land and water in the Long Island Sound, the lower Thames River, and the lower Connecticut River.

== History ==
In the early 1980s, the state attempted to nominate a National Estuary Research Reserve in the region of the Connecticut River. The area considered spanned from Long Island Sound north to the limit of tidal action. Although the proposal was initially well-received, NOAA was unable to accept it due to funding limitations and the need to focus on under-represented areas of the country.

By the early 2000s, Connecticut had renewed their interest in securing a NERR. Although many organizations supported the state's efforts, NOAA was again unable to commit to the project. However, by mid-2005, NOAA indicated they were ready to provide guidance and support for a NERR in Connecticut.

Between 2016 and 2019, teams analyzed several potential sites for a reserve. The final site, which was formally nominated to NOAA in December 2019, combined state-owned properties in Lyme, Old Lyme, and Groton, as well as portions of the lower Connecticut River, lower Thames River, eastern Long Island Sound, and western Fishers Island Sound. After a review, NOAA accepted the nomination in 2020.

In early 2022, upon completion of the steps required for designation, the University of Connecticut assumed the role of the lead state agency for the CT NERR. They have partnered with the Connecticut Department of Energy and Environmental Protection, which retains management authority over the lands they own. The reserve was designated when the final management plan went into effect on January 14, 2022. This agreement will remain in effect until terminated by one of the parties involved.

== Administration ==
The reserve is administered under a partnership of the National Oceanic Atmospheric Administration, the University of Connecticut, and the Connecticut Department of Energy and Environmental Protection.

The National Oceanic and Atmospheric Administration is the lead federal agency and provides funding and national guidance for the NERR, and conducts periodic performance evaluations.

The University of Connecticut is the lead state agency and responsible for overall management and day-to-day operations.

While most of the reserve is aquatic, the Connecticut Department of Energy and Environmental Protection owns several land-based components of the reserve, making them an operational partner.

The Connecticut Audubon Society played a role in the designation process by serving on the Connecticut Designation Steering Committee, which oversaw compliance with NOAA procedures.
