= Jacques Cousteau National Estuarine Research Reserve =

Nature reserve in New Jersey, US

Coordinates: 39.595°N 74.347°W

Boundaries of the Jacques Cousteau National Estuarine Research Reserve

The Jacques Cousteau National Estuarine Research Reserve, located in southeastern New Jersey, encompasses over 116,116 acres (nearly 470 km^{2}) of terrestrial, wetland and aquatic habitats within the Mullica River-Great Bay ecosystem.

A wide range of habitats includes the pinelands, lowland swamps, freshwater marshes, salt and freshwater tidal marshes, barrier islands (sandy beaches and dune habitats), shallow bays and the coastal ocean. Little more than one percent of this reserve has been subject to human development. The area is one of the least disturbed estuaries in the densely populated urban corridor of the northeastern United States.

On October 20, 1997, the Jacques Cousteau National Estuarine Research Reserve (JC NERR) was dedicated in honor of Jacques-Yves Cousteau. The JC NERR is one of 30 National Estuarine Research Reserves (NERR) created to promote responsible use and management of the estuaries in the United States. Estuaries, where the rivers meet the sea, are the wide lower course of a river where its current is met by the tides. This mix of fresh and salt water creates a unique and very productive ecosystem vital to life both on land and in the sea.

The mission of the Jacques Cousteau National Estuarine Research Reserve is to improve management of important estuarine resources in the Mullica River-Great Bay watershed through a program combining scientific research, education, and stewardship. JC NERR conducts research on the physical, chemical and biological components of the site estuaries and neighboring watersheds. The JC NERR offers a variety of professional development programs for teachers highlighting the unique coastal resources of New Jersey for the K-12 classroom. It also offers training programs, resources and outreach materials for New Jersey’s Coastal Management Community. The "Life on the Edge" exhibit housed at the Tuckerton Seaport is a virtual walk from the headwaters of the Mullica River, through the Pinelands, into the marsh ecosystem in Great Bay and then finally out into the open ocean. Visitors learn about the biology, ecology, and importance of estuarine habitats.

Properties within the Reserve are public owned by various state and Federal entities. The Institute of Marine and Coastal Sciences at Rutgers, The State University of New Jersey is the managing partner of JC NERR. Other agency partners include the New Jersey Department of Environmental Protection, The Edwin B. Forsythe National Wildlife Refuge, Stockton University, the Pinelands Commission, The Tuckerton Seaport and The Cooperative Institute of Coastal and Estuarine Environmental Technology.
