= Coastal States Organization =

U.S. nonprofit organization

- Formation: 1970
- Type: Environmental
- Legal status: Non-Profit
- Purpose: Development of coastal zone management legislation and programs
- Headquarters: Washington, D.C.
- Region served: United States
- Website: www.coastalstates.org

The Coastal States Organization (CSO) is a U.S. non-profit organization located in Washington, D.C., that represents the Governors of the nation's thirty-five coastal states, commonwealths and territories. CSO represents the Governors on legislative and policy issues relating to the sound management of coastal, Great Lakes and ocean resources. It contributes to the development of coastal zone management legislation and programs.

== History ==
At the 1969 National Governor's Association Conference, a committee on national marine affairs introduced the resolution to create CSO which was endorsed unanimously., The resolution noted the growing public interest and concern in maintaining the quality of the environment, and that state and territorial governments had not been adequately represented in the emerging national coastal programs. The resolution further emphasized that state governments could best increase their ability to contribute to development and operation of the National Oceanographic and Coastal Zone Management Programs by forming an organization designed to achieve these purposes. The organization thus came into being in 1970.

In recognition of the need for preserving the invaluable and irreplaceable marine resources of the Nation, and in response to the National Governors' Conference policy statement calling for the formation of a maritime states organization to pursue those ends, the Coastal States Organization was established. Among its responsibilities, the Organization will: (a) contribute to the development of common policy regarding national coastal zone management legislation and programs, and serve as spokesman for the maritime States, territories, and trust territories on marine and coastal affairs; (b) provide mutual assistance in solving common state and intermarine resource problems; and (c) serve as a clearinghouse for information relative to marine activities of the member States. In affirmation of the responsibilities and powers of the States in the management of marine and coastal affairs, and in recognition of the purpose of the Coastal States Organization to further these goals, the Governors urge all eligible States to become members of the Organization, and encourage the full cooperation of all States, inland as well as coastal, in the efforts of the Organization.

— Proceedings of the National Governor's Conference, 1970

== Membership and organization ==
The Organization's membership consists of the thirty-five coastal states, commonwealths and territories, which are represented by delegates appointed by the Governors. Including senior state officials from the state environmental, natural resource, or planning agencies, these delegates constitute CSO's Governing Board.

== Priorities ==
Organizational priorities for 2012–2014 are: Coastal Zone Management, Climate Change Adaptation, Coastal Land Acquisition, National/Regional Ocean and Coastal Governance, Corals, and Funding.

Organizational priorities in 2008–2009 were: Climate change, Coastal Zone Management Act Reauthorization, Energy/Outer Continental Shelf (OCS) activities and appropriations.
