= Wells National Estuarine Research Reserve =

Protected area in Maine, United States

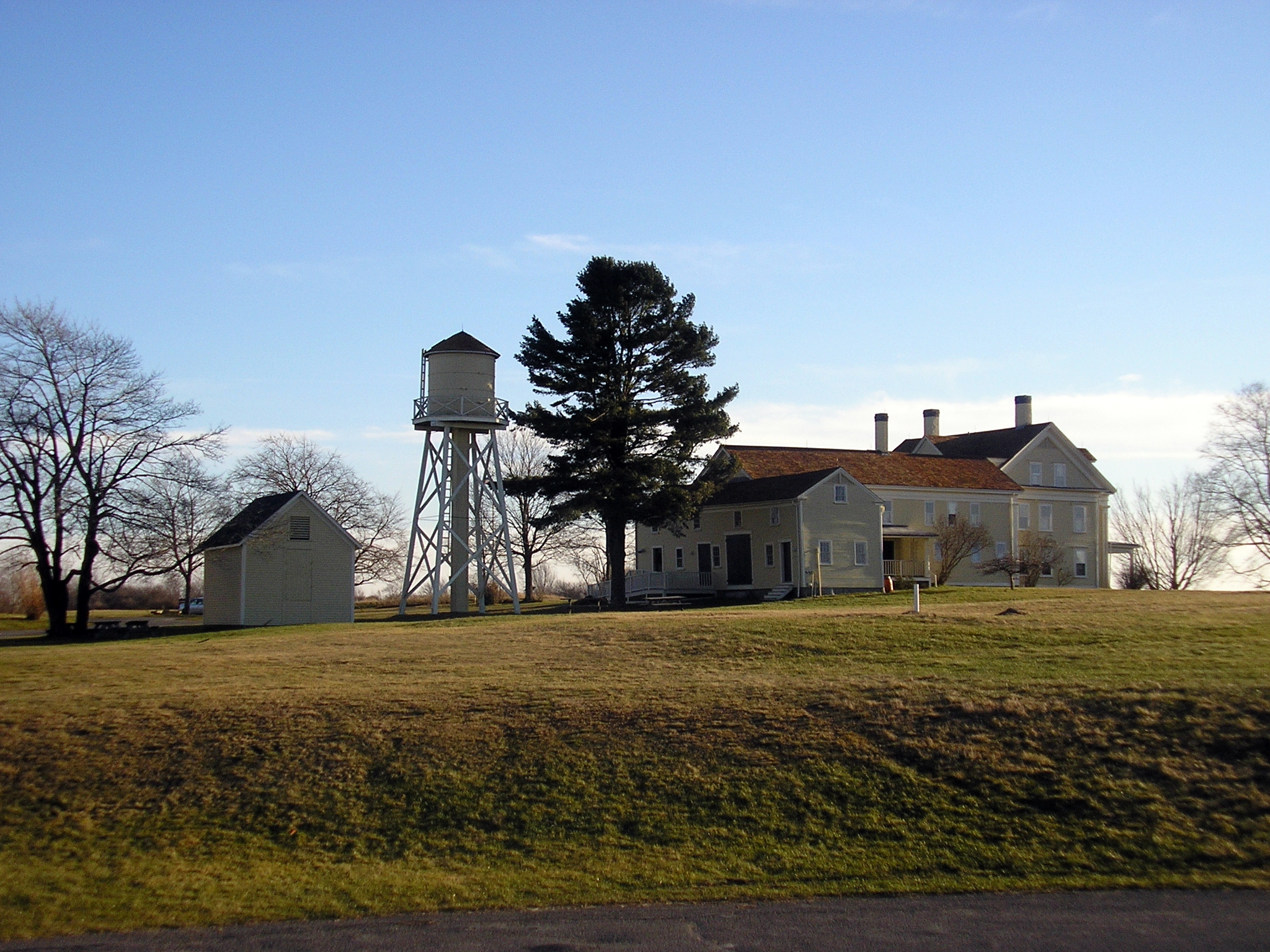
- Laudholm Farm buildings.

- Location within the United States
- Location: Wells, Maine
- Coordinates: 43°20′19″N 70°33′13″W
- Area: 2,250 acres (9.1 km^{2})
- Established: 1984
- Website: www.wellsreserve.org

Wells National Estuarine Research Reserve, also known as Wells Reserve, is a National Estuarine Research Reserve located in Wells, Maine.

== History ==
Established in 1984, Wells Reserve manages 2,250 acres (9.1 km^{2}) of coastal habitat and is headquartered at the historic Laudholm Farm. The land managed by the reserve lies partially within the Rachel Carson National Wildlife Refuge. Funding for the reserve is provided in part by the National Oceanic and Atmospheric Administration, as well as by the nonprofit Laudholm Trust.

== Description ==
Wells Reserve is located along the coast of the Gulf of Maine. The land managed by the reserve includes fields, forests, salt marsh, tidal freshwater marsh, and sandy beaches. The reserve includes the campus of Laudholm Farm, which serves as the reserve's headquarters. Laudholm Farm is listed on the National Register of Historic Places.

The reserve also features a visitor center and the Maine Coastal Ecology Center, which hosts educational exhibits featuring the landscape, history, and ecology of the reserve. The Maine Coastal Ecology Center also has research facilities for visiting scientists.

== Research and monitoring ==
Since the 1980s, the Wells Reserve research program has been expanding knowledge of coasts and estuaries with an emphasis on ensuring healthy salt marsh ecosystems. Some key areas of research include:

- Fish distribution and growth
- Salt marsh restoration
- Coastal watershed land use
- Invasive species
- Biological productivity in estuaries
- Patterns in plant communities
- Avian productivity and survivorship
- Lyme disease ecology

Staff scientists also monitor trends in weather, water quality, nutrients, and plant and animal communities, contributing to a national effort that promotes effective coastal zone management.

== Education and training ==
Wells Reserve educators engage people in environmental education, both on-site and in local communities. Each year, more than 3,000 children and adults participate in a variety of educational programs at the site, which serves as a living laboratory. The Wells Reserve also maintains indoor facilities to enrich teaching opportunities. Formal educational offerings include:

- school field trips
- teacher trainings
- guided tours and programs
- lectures and workshops
- curriculum kit rentals
- activity backpacks and trail guides
- summer day camps

The nationally recognized Coastal Training Program provides resource managers, regulators, politicians, and other decision-makers with information on sound coastal management, as well as opportunities to collaborate on watershed initiatives.

== Conservation and stewardship ==
Wells Reserve resource specialists manage about 500 acres (2.0 km^{2}) representing many habitats that support impressive flora and fauna. Acting as a model site for stewardship, methods of active management employed at the Wells Reserve include:

- controlling invasive plant species
- maintaining and creating shrublands as wildlife habitat
- protecting rare plants and endangered animals
- maintaining fields for grassland nesting birds
- managing an over-abundant deer population

The Wells Reserve also involves communities in conservation by providing mapping services, technical assistance, training programs, and conservation data useful for the protection and care of land and water resources.

== Protection and preservation ==
The protected lands comprising the Wells Reserve are entirely within the Town of Wells, Maine. These conservation lands are owned by the Maine Department of Conservation (533 acres), United States Fish and Wildlife Service/Rachel Carson National Wildlife Refuge (1,428 acres), Town of Wells (249 acres), and Wells Reserve Management Authority (40 acres).

The Wells Reserve site, farmed for over three centuries, holds a prominent place in the town's history. The Laudholm Farm campus reflects New England's progressive farming era. By the 1970s, farming had ceased to be viable, but the effort to permanently protect Laudholm stimulated the establishment of Maine's only National Estuarine Research Reserve. Laudholm Farm's buildings were restored and renovated to respect a treasured heritage while creating a platform for Wells Reserve research, education, and stewardship programs.
