= Outer Continental Shelf =

Maritime U.S. federal zone of jurisdiction

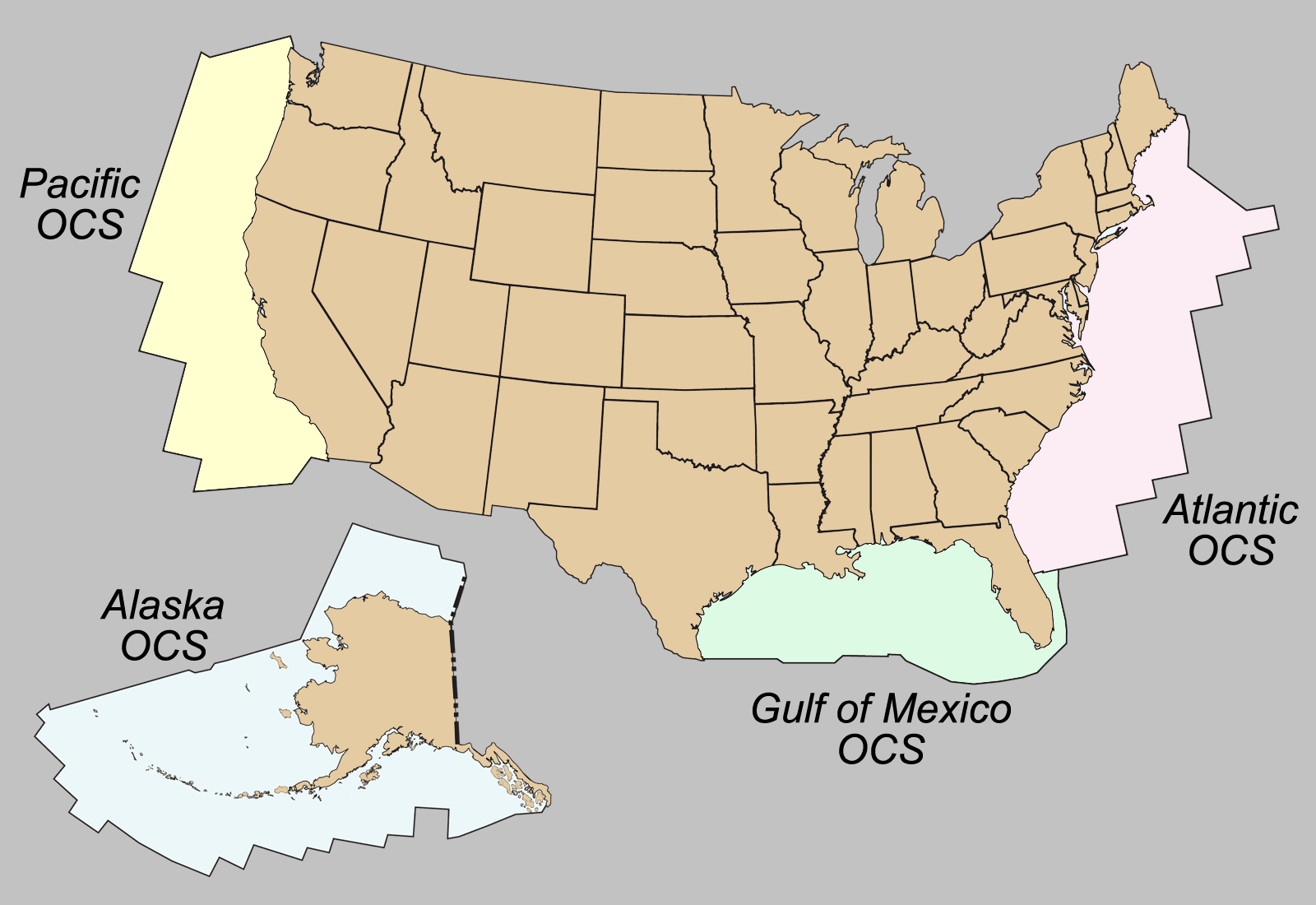
Map of the Outer Continental Shelf

The Outer Continental Shelf (OCS) is a legally defined geographic feature of the United States. The OCS is the part of the internationally recognized continental shelf of the United States which does not fall under the jurisdictions of the individual U.S. states.

The exclusive economic zone of the United States extends 200 nautical miles (370 km; 230 mi) from the coast, and thus overlaps but is not coterminous with the Outer Continental Shelf.

On December 19, 2023, the United States Department of State announced the results of its “U.S. Extended Continental Shelf Project”. It declared an expansion in the outer boundaries of the United States continental shelf in numerous regions. The U.S. Extended Continental Shelf partially overlaps with ECS areas of Canada, The Bahamas, and Japan. In these areas, the United States and these countries will need to establish maritime boundaries in the future.

== Definition ==
Formally, the OCS is governed by Title 43, Chapter 29 "Submerged Lands", Subchapter III "Outer Continental Shelf Lands", of the U.S. Code which was created under the Outer Continental Shelf Act enacted by the 83rd United States Congress and signed into law by President Dwight D. Eisenhower in 1953. The term "outer Continental Shelf" refers to all submerged land, its subsoil and seabed that belong to the United States and are lying seaward and outside the states' jurisdiction, the latter defined as the "lands beneath navigable waters" in Title 43, Chapter 29, Subchapter I, Section 1301.

The United States OCS has been divided into four leasing regions:

- Gulf of Mexico OCS Region
- Atlantic OCS Region
- Pacific OCS Region
- Alaska OCS Region

State jurisdiction is defined as follows:

- Texas and the Gulf coast of Florida are extended 3 marine leagues (approximately 9 nautical miles) seaward from the baseline from which the breadth of the territorial sea is measured.
- Louisiana is extended 3 (pre-1954 U.S.) nautical miles (5.560 km; 3.455 mi) seaward of the baseline from which the breadth of the territorial sea is measured (as defined pre-1954 in the U.S.: nautical mile = 6080.2 feet).
- All other States' seaward limits are extended 3 international nautical miles (5.556 km; 3.452 mi) seaward of the baseline from which the breadth of the territorial sea is measured.

Federal jurisdiction extends from the outer limit of state jurisdiction to the international limit of the United States' claims on seabed rights. Though the United States has not ratified the United Nations Convention on the Law of the Sea, it accepts the same limits as defined in that treaty.

Specifically, the seaward limit is defined as the farthest of 200 nautical miles (370.4 km; 230.2 mi) seaward of the baseline from which the breadth of the territorial sea is measured or, if the continental shelf can be shown to exceed 200 nautical miles, a distance not greater than a line 100 nautical miles from the 2,500-meter (8,200 ft) isobath or a line 350 nautical miles (648.2 km; 402.8 mi) from the baseline.

Outer Continental Shelf limits greater than 200 nautical miles but less than either the 2,500-meter isobath plus 100 nmi or 350 nmi are defined by a line 60 nautical miles (111.1 km; 69.0 mi) seaward of the foot of the continental slope or by a line seaward of the foot of the continental slope connecting points where the sediment thickness divided by the distance to the foot of the slope equals 0.01, whichever is farthest.

Coastlines are emergent coastline. Thus the landward boundary of the outer continental shelf is a legal construct rather than a physical construct, modified only at intervals by appropriate processes of law.

== Regulatory bodies ==
For legislation concerning the OCS, the United States Senate Committee on Commerce, Science & Transportation has jurisdiction within the United States Senate. In the House of Representatives, the Committee on Natural Resources Subcommittee on Energy and Mineral Resources has jurisdiction over administration and legislation amending the OCSLA. One of the main pieces of legislature affecting the OCS is the Outer Continental Shelf Lands Act (OCSLA), created on August 7, 1953, which defined the OCS as all submerged lands lying seaward of state coastal waters (3 miles offshore) under U.S. jurisdiction; under the OCSLA, the Secretary of the Interior is responsible for the administration of mineral exploration and development of the OCS. The OCSLA has been amended several times, most recently by the Inflation Reduction Act of 2022.

After Congress passed the Federal Oil and Gas Royalty Management Act in 1982, the Secretary of the Interior designated the Minerals Management Service (MMS) as the administrative agency responsible for the mineral leasing of submerged OCS lands and for the supervision of offshore operations; in 2010 MMS was renamed the Bureau of Ocean Energy Management, Regulation and Enforcement (BOEMRE). On October 1, 2011, BOEMRE was divided into two bureaus, the Bureau of Safety and Environmental Enforcement (BSEE) and the Bureau of Ocean Energy Management (BOEM). BSEE is the agency charged to provide regulatory oversight of deepwater oil drilling and offshore wind energy sources in U.S. Federal waters that extend beyond State jurisdiction.

== See also ==
- Extended continental shelf
- Beach evolution
- Chukchi Sea Shelf
- Coastal geography
- Coastal States Organization
- International Boundary and Water Commission
- Maritime Security Regimes
- Maritime security (USCG)
- United Nations Convention on the Law of the Sea (Law of the Sea Treaty)
