= National Estuarine Research Reserve System =

Network of 30 protected areas in the US

- NERRS
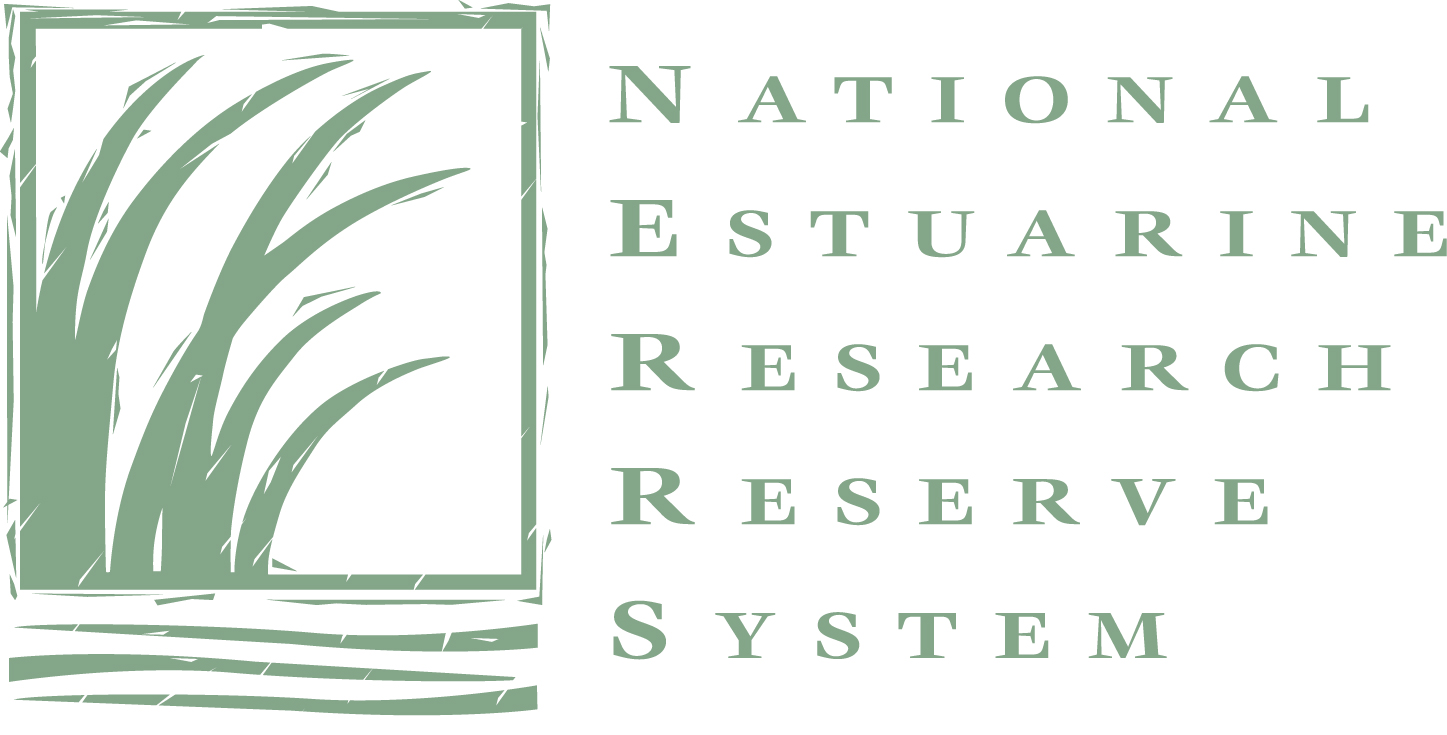

Agency overview
- Formed: 1972
- Parent Agency: National Oceanic and Atmospheric Administration and state agencies
- Website: coast.noaa.gov/nerrs/

Map
- Map of current reserves

The National Estuarine Research Reserve System (NERRS) is a network of 30 protected areas established by partnerships between the National Oceanic and Atmospheric Administration (NOAA) and coastal states. The reserves represent different biogeographic regions of the United States. The National Estuarine Research Reserve System protects more than 1.3 million acres of coastal and estuarine habitats for long-term research, water-quality monitoring, education, and coastal stewardship.

== Background ==
For thousands of years, coastal and estuarine environments have provided people with food, safe harbors, transportation access, flood control, and a place to play and relax. The pressures on the nation's coast are enormous and the impacts on economies and ecosystems are becoming increasingly evident. Severe storms, climate change, pollution, habitat alteration and rapid population growth threaten the ecological functions that have supported coastal communities throughout history. Estuaries are the connection between the ocean (or Great Lakes) and the land and humans depend on both for their very existence, so caring for both – and the connection between them – is vital to humans.

The System was established by the Coastal Zone Management Act (CZMA) of 1972 as estuarine sanctuaries and was renamed to estuarine research reserves in the 1988 reauthorization of the CZMA. NOAA provides funding, national guidance and technical assistance. Each reserve is managed on daily basis by a lead state agency or university, with input from local partners.

Reserve staff work with local communities and regional groups to address natural resource management issues, such as non-point source pollution, habitat restoration and invasive species. Through integrated research and education, the reserves help communities develop strategies to deal successfully with these coastal resource issues. Reserves provide adult audiences with training on estuarine issues of concern in their local communities, offer field classes for K-12 students, and provide estuary education to teachers through the Teachers on the Estuary program. Reserves also provide long-term water quality monitoring as well as opportunities for both scientists and graduate students to conduct research in a "living laboratory".

== Core programs ==
=== Research and monitoring ===
The National Estuarine Research Reserves serve as living laboratories to support coastal research and long-term monitoring and to provide facilities for on-site staff, visiting scientists and graduate students. They also serve as reference sites for comparative studies on coastal topics such as ecosystem dynamics, human influences on estuarine systems, habitat conservation and restoration, species management, and social science. Additionally, the reserves serve as sentinel sites to better understand the effects of climate change.

The goals of the Reserve System's research and monitoring program include:

- ensuring a stable environment for research through long-term protection of Reserve resources
- addressing coastal management issues through coordinated estuarine research within the System
- collecting information necessary for improved understanding and management of estuarine areas, and making the information available to stakeholders

Each reserve works on a variety of research projects, in addition to participating in the System-wide Monitoring Program. The topics of these projects are varied and depend on local needs and issues, as well as issues of national concern. Topics may include issues such as investigating the impacts of non-point source pollution, understanding the role of social science in coastal resource management, and controlling invasive species.

==== System-Wide Monitoring Program (SWMP) ====
The System Wide Monitoring Program (SWMP, pronounced "swamp") was established in 1995 as a means of observing short-term variability and long-term changes in estuarine regions. Each reserve participates in SWMP which provides researchers, resource managers, educators, and other coastal decision makers with standardized, quantitative measures to determine how reserve conditions are changing. By using standard operating procedures for each component across all 30 reserves, SWMP data helps establish the reserves as a system of national reference sites, as well a network of sentinel sites for detecting and understanding the effects of climate change in coastal regions.

SWMP currently has three major components that focus on:

- abiotic indicators of water quality and weather
- biological monitoring
- watershed, habitat, and land use mapping

Abiotic parameters include nutrients, temperature, salinity, pH, dissolved oxygen, and in some cases, contaminants. Biological monitoring includes measures of biodiversity, habitat, and population characteristics. Watershed and land use classifications provide information on types of land use by humans and changes in land cover associated with each reserve. SWMP data for each reserve are managed by the Centralized Data Management Office (CDMO), which is managed through a grant to the University of South Carolina and is housed at the North Inlet-Winyah Bay Reserve in South Carolina. SWMP data can be viewed and downloaded from the CDMO.

==== NERRS Science Collaborative ====
The NERRS Science Collaborative is designed to put Reserve-based science to work for local communities. Administered by the University of Michigan (UM), the program funds research projects that bring scientists, intended users of the science, stakeholders, educators, and trainers together to address problems related to coastal pollution and habitat degradation in the context of climate change. The results of these projects is shared throughout the System. The Collaborative also sponsors a UM-based graduate and professional education program focused on helping individuals develop the skills needed to link science-based information to coastal resource management decisions.

=== Education ===
National Estuarine Research Reserves are federally designated "to enhance public awareness and understanding of estuarine areas, and provide suitable opportunities for public education and interpretation." Each research reserve is an active member of the local and regional education community and a representative of the state and NOAA stewardship community. The reserve system takes a local approach in advancing estuarine education and generating meaningful experiences for all kinds of people interested in learning about, protecting and restoring estuaries.

The Estuary Education Program strives to enhance student, teacher, and public awareness, understanding, and appreciation of estuaries by providing hands-on, investigative field experiences, curriculum and information material, multi-exposure opportunities, teacher training programs, and public outreach events. The Estuary Education Network is working to advance estuary, climate & ocean literacy. Estuaries can be used as a powerful context to support learning about the interconnections and interdependencies between terrestrial and ocean systems, what important services they provide for humans, and how to restore and protect them.

=== Training ===
The National Estuarine Research Reserve System's Coastal Training Program (CTP) was formally initiated in 2001 to provide up-to-date scientific information and skill-building opportunities to the people who are responsible for making decisions affecting coastal lands and waters of the United States. Through this program, National Estuarine Research Reserves can ensure that coastal decision-makers have the knowledge and tools they need to address critical resource management issues of concern to local communities. Coastal Training Programs offered by reserves focus on issues such as stormwater management, community development, restoration science, land use planning and others. Since 2006, these reserve-based programs have delivered more than 400 evaluated training events reaching at least 13,000 decision-makers in the coastal zone.

=== Stewardship ===
A core mission of the Reserves is to protect and conserve the more than 1.3 million acres of coastal and estuarine habitat within reserves and to facilitate improved stewardship of coastal habitats outside reserve boundaries. The Reserve System's stewardship approach uses the best available science to maintain and restore healthy, productive and resilient ecosystems, and disseminates information to regional and national stakeholders. Site-based stewardship strategies assess and respond to threats from coastal development, human use of reserve resources, climate change, and invasive species.

==== Stewardship issues addressed by NERRS ====
===== Invasive species =====
Invasive species are species not native to an ecosystem, and whose introduction to that ecosystem can harm the environment, public health or welfare. Reserves manage for invasive species through preventing new introductions and through managed removal if appropriate.

===== Species of concern =====
Reserves manage and restore habitat to support species of concern by restoring degraded habitat, enhancing habitat connectivity to support multiple life stages of particular species, managing visitor use pressure during critical life stages and restoring species and habitats such as native oysters and sea grass beds where possible. Reserves also work within the watershed to identify, protect, and restore critical habitat for estuarine species such as salmon.

===== Fire management =====
Many reserves manage habitat that require fire to survive. Fire management through prescribed burns is particularly challenging as these areas often are located near development. Many reserves manage these fire dependent habitats and monitor habitat and species recovery.

===== Hydrologic restoration =====
Development along our nation's estuaries often results in hydrologic restrictions from roads, dykes, and railroads. These restrictions alter habitat, water quality, and species distribution. Many reserves are addressing these impacts by managing or restoring hydrology through the replacement of culverts, management of tide gates, and/or removal of dykes.

===== Water quality =====
Water quality is a fundamental indicator of the impacts from coastal watersheds and the health of estuarine ecosystems. Good water quality affects coastal habitat quality and human communities that rely on estuaries for recreation and livelihoods. Water quality parameters such as clarity, oxygen content, nutrient concentration, temperature, sedimentation, pH, salinity and others all have profound impacts on natural and human communities in coastal ecosystems.

The reserves are addressing water quality through intensive abiotic monitoring of estuarine habitats through the System-Wide Monitoring Program, working with farmers to develop and monitor best management practices from agriculture, monitoring the impacts of canopy cover on salmon habitats, addressing sedimentation impacts into coastal streams by working with adjacent land owners and evaluating land use impacts through tools such as the Non-Point Source Pollution, Erosion and Control (NSPECT) tool.

===== Habitat alteration =====
Coastal and estuarine habitats include marshes, forested wetlands, oyster reefs, seagrass beds, beaches, tidal streams, and riparian forests. These habitats are vital not only for fish, birds, and other wildlife, but for human communities as well. They help to protect against flooding, improve water quality, provide recreational opportunities, and support commercial fisheries and tourism. Restoring habitats helps ecosystems by removing pollutants and invasive species, re-establishing natural ecosystem processes, and re-introducing native plants and other wildlife.

The Reserves are working with several NOAA programs and a variety of regional partners to improve the science in support of habitat restoration, restore coastal habitats, control invasive species, protect habitat through acquisition, and implement land management practices that balance the needs for conservation and public access.

===== Habitat mapping and change =====
The Reserve System's Habitat Mapping and Change Plan was developed in 2007 to establish the framework for mapping habitats in reserves for long-term change related to local sea-level change and human-caused stress from reserve watersheds. The habitat mapping and change plan is supported by additional documents including the NERR Land Cover and Habitat Classification System and associated implementation protocols and documentation.

===== Restoration =====
As living laboratories, the reserves are ideal settings to investigate the restoration and protection of estuarine and coastal habitat. Because of their federally protected status, biogeographic diversity, on-site facilities, long-term monitoring programs and data, and professional staff capabilities in science and education, the reserves are excellent platforms for advancing the science of restoration, staging demonstration restoration projects, and monitoring their long-term response. Most reserves have extensive areas of undisturbed habitat. These are useful as long-term scientific reference sites for understanding estuarine ecosystems and comparing them with other more disturbed habitats in similar physical settings.

To date, the majority of the reserves have engaged in restoration science and have planned or conducted small to medium-scale restoration projects (0.5 to 250 acres). An inventory of key habitats at the reserves and restoration activities and priorities conducted in 2000 and updated in 2001 is summarized in the NERRS Restoration Science Strategy. Reserves have investigated both engineering and natural approaches to restore areas to approximate natural, unaltered conditions. Several reserves must first address water quality issues and/or restore hydrologic regimes (i.e. sheet flow, tidal exchange, and freshwater drainage) before they can restore terrestrial and aquatic native plant communities and achieve faunal and ecological recovery.

== Current reserves ==
Reserve	State	Designation Year
Apalachicola National Estuarine Research Reserve	Florida	1979
Ashepoo Combahee Edisto Basin National Estuarine Research Reserve	South Carolina	1992
Chesapeake Bay National Estuarine Research Reserve (Maryland)	Maryland	1985
Chesapeake Bay National Estuarine Research Reserve (Virginia)	Virginia	1991
Connecticut National Estuarine Research Reserve	Connecticut	2022
Delaware National Estuarine Research Reserve	Delaware	1993
Elkhorn Slough National Estuarine Research Reserve	California	1979
Grand Bay National Estuarine Research Reserve	Mississippi	1999
Great Bay National Estuarine Research Reserve	New Hampshire	1989
Guana Tolomato Matanzas National Estuarine Research Reserve	Florida	1999
He‘eia National Estuarine Research Reserve	Hawai‘i	2017
Hudson River National Estuarine Research Reserve	New York	1982
Jacques Cousteau National Estuarine Research Reserve	New Jersey	1998
Jobos Bay National Estuarine Research Reserve	Puerto Rico	1981
Kachemak Bay National Estuarine Research Reserve	Alaska	1999
Lake Superior National Estuarine Research Reserve	Wisconsin	2011
Mission-Aransas National Estuarine Research Reserve	Texas	2006
Narragansett Bay National Estuarine Research Reserve	Rhode Island	1989
North Carolina National Estuarine Research Reserve	North Carolina	1985
North Inlet-Winyah Bay National Estuarine Research Reserve	South Carolina	1992
Old Woman Creek National Estuarine Research Reserve	Ohio	1980
Padilla Bay National Estuarine Research Reserve	Washington	1980
Rookery Bay National Estuarine Research Reserve	Florida	1978
San Francisco Bay National Estuarine Research Reserve	California	2003
Sapelo Island National Estuarine Research Reserve	Georgia	1976
South Slough National Estuarine Research Reserve	Oregon	1974
Tijuana River National Estuarine Research Reserve	California	1981
Waquoit Bay National Estuarine Research Reserve	Massachusetts	1988
Weeks Bay National Estuarine Research Reserve	Alabama	1986
Wells National Estuarine Research Reserve	Maine	1984

== See also ==
- National Estuarine Research Reserve Data Mysteries
- National Estuarine Research Reserve Estuaries Education
- National Estuarine Research Reserve - Teacher's on the Estuary Workshops
- Coastal and Estuarine Research Federation
- National Estuary Program
