= Chesapeake Bay National Estuarine Research Reserve (Virginia) =

Protected area in the United States

Coordinates: 37°26′3″N 76°43′15″W

The Chesapeake Bay National Estuarine Research Reserve – Virginia (CBNERR-VA) is one of 30 protected areas that make up the National Estuarine Research Reserve System (NERRS). Designated in 1991, it was established to promote informed management of the nation's estuaries and coastal habitats.

Located in the southern subregion of the Chesapeake Bay, the nation's largest estuary, CBNERR-VA is a steward of four reserves that protect a diversity of estuarine habitat: Sweet Hall Marsh, Taskinas Creek, Catlett Islands and the Goodwin Islands. This multi-component system is situated along the York River's salinity gradient, making CBNERR-VA the foremost authority on York River estuarine habitat and water quality.

CBNERR-VA is administered as a partnership between the Commonwealth of Virginia and the National Oceanic and Atmospheric Administration (NOAA), while managed on a daily basis by the Virginia Institute of Marine Science (VIMS). As such, its research informs local, state and national policy.
