= Submergent coastline =

Coast submerged by a relative rise in sea levels

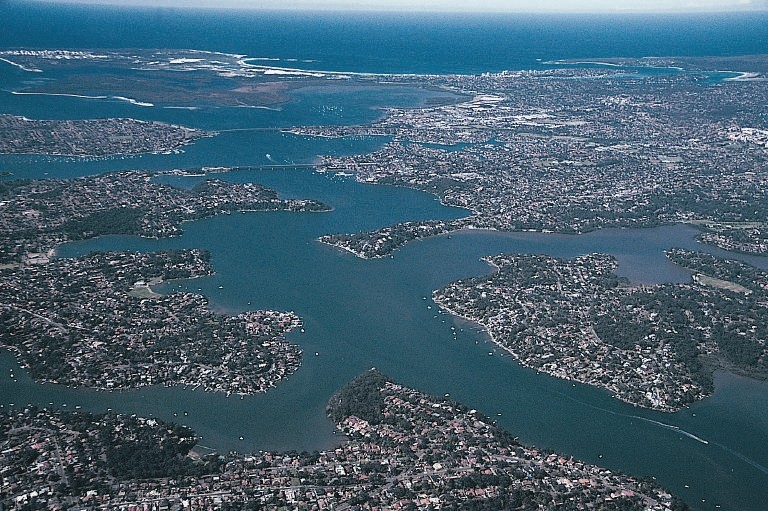
A submergent landform: the drowned river valley (ria) of Georges River in the greater Sydney area, Australia

Submergent coastlines or drowned coastlines are stretches along the coast that have been inundated by the sea by a relative rise in sea levels from either isostacy or eustacy.

Submergent coastlines are the opposite of emergent coastlines, which have experienced a relative fall in sea levels.

Many submergent coastlines were formed by the end of the Last Glacial Period (LGP), when glacial retreat caused both global sea level rise and also localised changes to land height.

== Formation ==
Submergent coastlines form either when sea level rises or the land level falls. This can be caused by isostatic or eustatic change. Both isostatic and eustatic change can be caused by a variety of reasons.

Isostatic change could be due to post-glacial adjustment. Another common cause of isostatic change that can result in a submergent coastline is tectonic action. Events such as earthquakes or volcanic eruptions may cause land subsidence therefore causing isostatic sea level increases.

Eustatic sea level rise can also be caused by many reasons. One common reason is thermal expansion. Thermal expansion occurs when water gets warmer and so the volume of water increases, this therefore causes global sea level rise forming submergent coastlines.

== Common features ==
Features of a submergent coastline include:

=== Rias ===
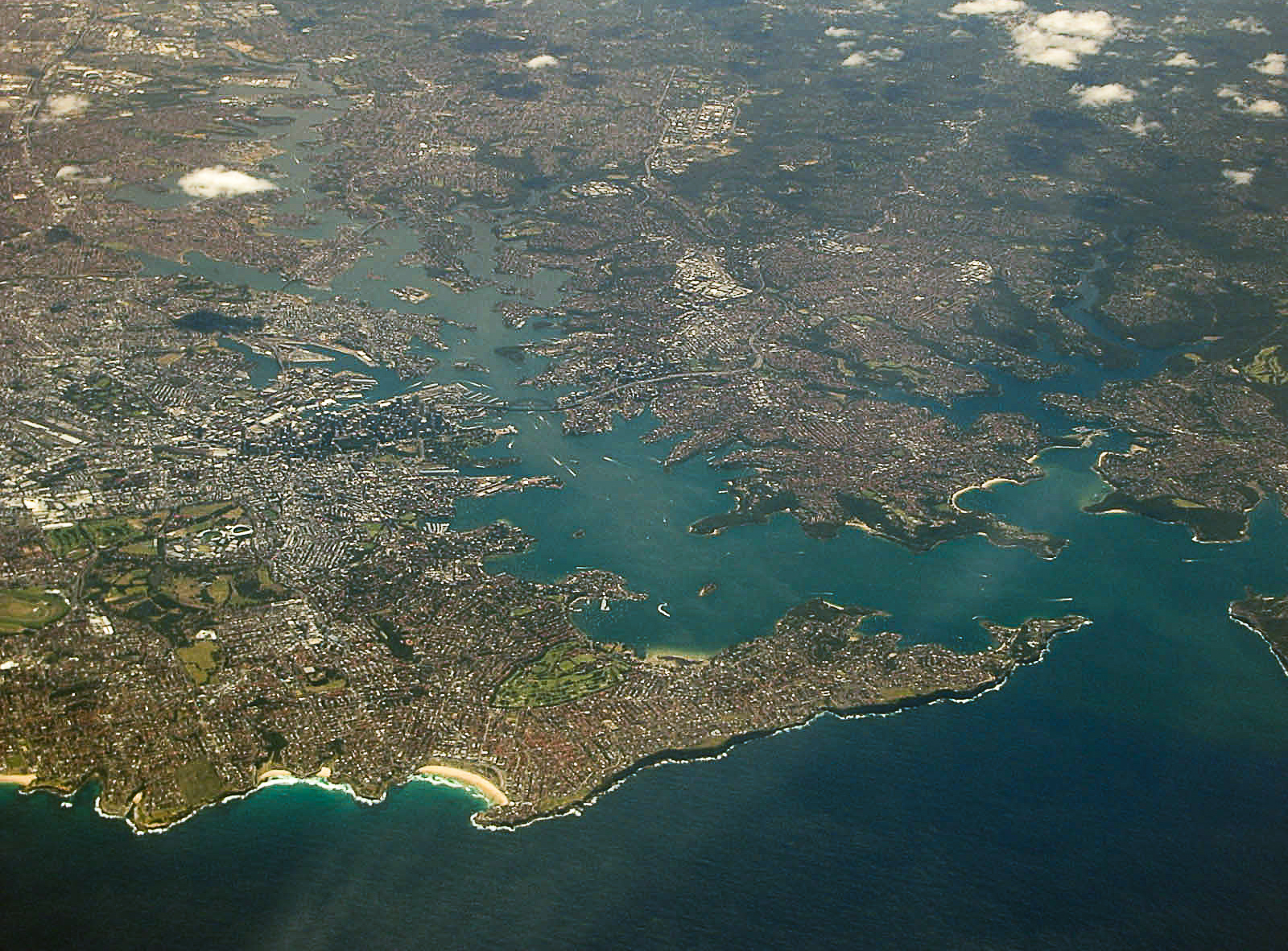
Sydney Harbour is one example of a ria.

Rias, a drowned river valley. They are a section of a river valley flooded by the sea, making them much wider than would be expected based on the river flowing into it. Many rias were formed by the rise in sea level after the melting of vast continental glaciers. Rias commonly have a widening funnel shape and gradually increasing depth as they move towards the coast. The widening and deepening of the ria towards the sea usually causes an exaggerated tidal effect within the estuary.

=== Fjords ===
Fjords, which are drowned glaciated valleys (Also known as U-shaped valleys). A section of a glacially eroded valley is flooded by the sea when a fjord is formed.

=== Dalmatian Coasts ===
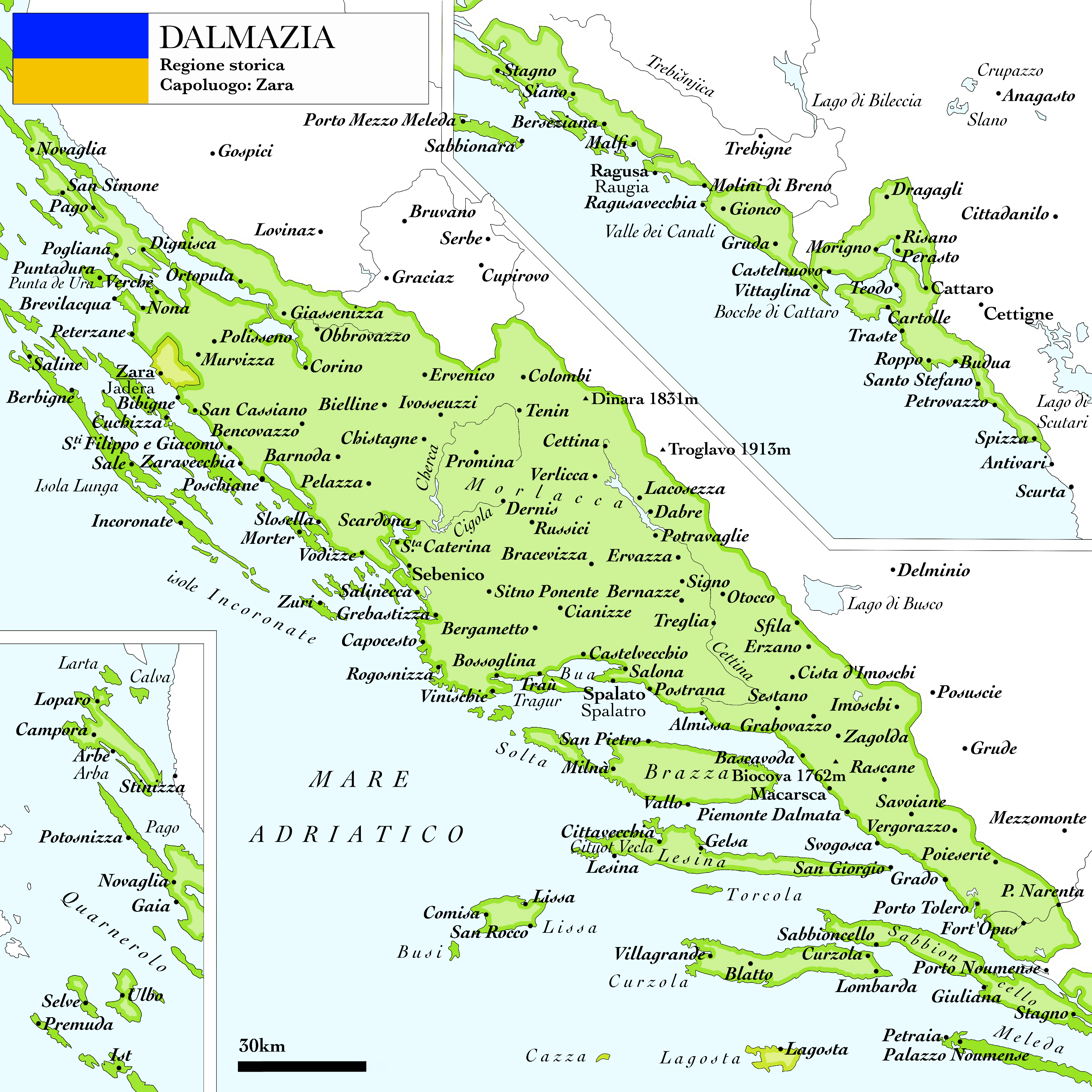
Map showing the Dalmatian coast of the Dalmatia region of Croatia. The narrow islands running parallel to the coast can be clearly seen.

Dalmatian coasts composed of long narrow islands running parallel to the coastline and separated from the coast by narrow sea channels called sounds. Dalmatian coasts are named after the Dalmatia region of Croatia which displays the common features of a dalmatian coast.

== Examples ==
Notable and illustrative examples of submergent coastlines include:

- Western Norway, famed for its many fjords created by sea level rise at the end of the LGP.
- The Western Coastal Plains of the Indian subcontinent, which includes the estuaries of the Narmada and the Tapti Rivers.
- Southern England and South Wales, caused by a "see-saw" reaction to uplift to the north of Great Britain after glacial retreat redistributed weight on the land, including many substantial rias such as Falmouth Harbour, Plymouth Harbour, Kingsbridge Estuary and Milford Haven.
- The Dalmatian coast, famed for its many small inshore islands, formed by sea level rise in the Mediterranean at the end of the LGP.
- Port Jackson or the Sydney Harbour in New South Wales, Australia is an example of a ria or drowned river valley.
