= Chesapeake Bay National Estuarine Research Reserve (Maryland) =

Estuary reserve in Maryland, US

The Chesapeake Bay National Estuarine Research Reserve is an estuary reserve in Maryland.

The Chesapeake Bay is the largest estuary in the United States and is one of the most productive bodies of water in the world. The Chesapeake Bay National Estuarine Research Reserve reflects the diversity of estuarine habitats found within the Bay and consists of three components:

- A 2,087 acres (8.45 km^{2}) freshwater tidal marsh at Jug Bay Wetlands Sanctuary located 20 miles (32 km) from Washington, D.C.
- A 726 acres (2.94 km^{2}) freshwater tidal marsh at the Otter Point Creek component 19 miles (30 km) northeast of Baltimore
- A 3,426 acres (13.86 km^{2}) salt marsh at the Monie Bay component located 20 miles (32 km) from Salisbury, Maryland.

Monie Bay was designated as a reserve in 1985. Jug Bay and Otter Point Creek were designated in 1990.

The purpose of the 6,249 acres (25.29 km^{2}) Maryland Reserve, managed by the Maryland Department of Natural Resources, is to manage protected estuarine areas as natural field laboratories and to develop and implement a coordinated program of research, monitoring, education and volunteer activities.

== Awards ==
- Robert Finton, an employee at the Reserve, was posthumously awarded an Environmental Hero Award by the National Oceanic and Atmospheric Administration, one of the Reserve's partner agencies.
