= Coastal Zone Management Act =

- Other short titles: Marine Resources and Engineering Development Act of 1966 Amendment
- Long title: An Act to establish a national policy and develop a national program for the management, beneficial use, protection, and development of the land and water resources of the Nation's coastal zones, and for other purposes.
- Acronyms (colloquial): CZMA
- Nicknames: Coastal Zone Management Act of 1972
- Enacted by: the 92nd United States Congress
- Effective: October 27, 1972

Citations
- Public law: 92-583
- Statutes at Large: 86 Stat. 1280

Codification
- Titles amended: 16 U.S.C.:Conservation
- U.S.C. sections created: 16 U.S.C. ch. 33 § 1451 et seq.

Legislative history
- Introduced in the Senate as S. 3507; Passed the Senate on April 25, 1972 (68-0); Passed the House on August 2, 1972 (261-112, in lieu of H.R. 14146); Signed into law by President Richard Nixon on October 27, 1972

Major amendments
- Pub. L. No. 109-58, the Energy Policy Act of 2005

The Coastal Zone Management Act of 1972 (CZMA; Pub. L. 92–583, 86 Stat. 1280, enacted October 27, 1972, 16 U.S.C. §§ 1451–1464, Chapter 33) is an Act of Congress passed in 1972 to encourage coastal states to develop and implement coastal zone management plans (CZMPs). This act was established as a United States National policy to preserve, protect, develop, and where possible, restore or enhance, the resources of the Nation's coastal zone for this and succeeding generations.

Alaska withdrew from participation in the National Coastal Management Program in 2011. Also, while the Deepwater Port Act requires a state to have, or be making progress toward a federally approved coastal management program in order to issue a license for a facility in adjacent federal waters, it does not apply to offshore oil and gas extraction.

== History ==
The Coastal Zone Management Act (CZMA) of 1972 showed that the United States Congress "recognized the importance of meeting the challenge of continued growth in the coastal zone". Under this act two national programs were created, the National Coastal Zone Management Program (CZMP) and the National Estuarine Research Reserve System. Out of 35 eligible states, only 34 have established management programs; Washington State was the first state to adopt the program in 1976.

The Coastal Zone Management Program (CZMP), also called the National Coastal Zone Management Program, was established under the Coastal Zone Management Act of 1972 and is administered by NOAA’s Office for Coastal Management (OCM). This program is designed to set up a basis for protecting, restoring, and establishing a responsibility in preserving and developing the nation’s coastal communities and resources, where they are under the highest pressure. The vision of the CZMP is to ensure that “the nation’s coast and oceans, including the Great Lakes and island territories, are healthy and thriving for this and future generation”. Their mission is “to ensure the conservation and responsible use of our nation’s coastal and ocean resources”.

The key goals of the National CZM program include: “protecting natural resources, managing development in high hazard areas, giving development priority to coastal-dependent uses, providing public access for recreation, coordinating state and federal actions”. Ultimately the outcomes from the CZMP are for “healthy and productive coastal ecosystems, and to have environmentally, economically, and socially vibrant and resilient coastal communities”.

The National Estuarine Research Reserve System is the second program established by the Coastal Zone Management Act of 1972 and is also administered by the National Oceanic and Atmospheric Administration (NOAA). NERRS is a network of 30 areas within the nation and various coastal states, which spans more than 1 million acres. These areas are used for long-term research, water-quality monitoring, education, and coastal stewardship.

The CZMA has been amended by the Coastal Zone Act Reauthorization Amendments of 1990.

== Components ==
Title 16 Chapter 33 – Coastal Zone Management Act

- 16 U.S.C. § 1451. Congressional findings

Congress found a national interest for the management protection and use of coastal zones. Coastal zones are valuable to the nation's current and future prosperity for their "natural, commercial, recreational, ecological, industrial, and esthetic resources." Many stresses are on the lands of coastal zone, from natural, residential, and industry and there is need to preserve and protect these areas. Some of the ecosystems are threatened by man, if lands aren’t preserved and protected all beneficial use can be lost forever. “In light of competing demands and the urgent need to protect and to give high priority to natural systems in the coastal zone…” Also, due to potential for global warming these areas need to be prepared for any alterations in water levels.

- 16 U.S.C. § 1452. Congressional declaration of policy

Congress declares in its national policy “to preserve, protect, develop, and where possible, to restore or enhance, the resources of the Nation's coastal zone for this and succeeding generations.” This is encouraged through the various states and coastal regions that want to actively participate in local, Federal, and State programs. These programs need to be aware of changes affecting the coastal areas and know how to act in response.

- 16 U.S.C. § 1453. Definitions

A “coastal zone" is defined as the “coastal waters and the adjacent shorelands, as well as includes islands, transitional and intertidal areas, salt marshes, wetlands, and beaches.”

- 16 U.S.C. § 1454. Management program development grants

These are awarded to coastal states that have developed a management program which has been approved through the Secretary.

- 16 U.S.C. § 1455. Administrative grants

Funds will be awarded through the Secretary to coastal states that establish management programs. States must identify clear boundaries for the coastal zone they wish to monitor and preserve, as well as define the lands subject to management. The State will conduct public hearings for the development of the program. The Governor of the State must also review and approve any changes to the program. Also the State has to ensure a method of regulation for local land and water usage within the defined areas.

- 16 U.S.C. § 1455a. Coastal resource improvement program

The Secretary can award grants to a coastal state to help that state meet such requirement as the preservation or restoration of areas designated under the program or that have coastal resources of national significance. This also means to establish public beaches as well as more public coastal regions and waters. Funding can be used to acquire more lands, and low-cost construction such as fences, parks, and paths.

- 16 U.S.C. § 1455b. Protecting coastal waters

Programs established, or applying for establishment, must give a general purpose for the land uses of the coastal zone. The state must include the critical coastal areas of the set region, establish management procedures, and technical assistance resources. The state needs to identify how it will be engaging public participation, for a community effort, this includes public hearings and the right for public education. States will demonstrate how they will establish coordination amongst local government bodies, state, and federal, and as how the potential boundary modification of the zone will affect the program.

- 16 U.S.C. § 1456. Coordination and cooperation

If other Federal agencies are interested in the program, the Secretary is responsible for coordination of their set activities with this body.

- 16 U.S.C. § 1456-1. Authorization of the Coastal and Estuarine Land Conservation Program

Under the Coastal Zone Management Program and the National Estuarine Reserve System, appropriate cooperation with local agencies, State and other agency will provide the means for protecting these zones. This is to preserve areas that have importance regarding “recreation, ecological, historical, or aesthetic values, or that are threatened by conversion from their natural, undeveloped, or recreational state.” The National Ocean Service of the National Oceanic and Atmospheric Administration (NOAA) through the Office of Ocean and Coastal Resource Management will administer the programs

- 16 U.S.C. § 1456a. Coastal Zone Management Fund
- 16 U.S.C. § 1456b. Coastal Zone Enhancement Grants

Grants will be subject to the limitations of the goals of coastal zone enhancement objectives. This means that the state will aim toward either the protection, restoration or the enhancement of the coastal zone or for the creation of new wetlands. This also includes, protecting and reducing threats to the environment and managing potential hazards; the areas should include public access venues pertaining to aesthetic, historical, or cultural value; and management and prevention of debris.

- 16 U.S.C. § 1456c. Technical assistance

A network will be established by the Secretary to support the development and implementation of the coastal management program into the State.

- 16 U.S.C. § 1457. Public hearings

Hearings will be announced 30 days in advance and will provide documentation of studies and data available for public viewing. This is similar to the effect as documentation of data will be available for public viewing as the agency becomes aware of it.

- 16 U.S.C. § 1458. Review of performance
- 16 U.S.C. § 1459. Records and audit
- 16 U.S.C. § 1460. Walter B. Jones Excellence in Coastal Zone Management Awards
- 16 U.S.C. § 1461. National Estuarine Research Reserve System
- 16 U.S.C. § 1462. Coastal Zone Management Reports
- 16 U.S.C. § 1463. Rules and Regulations

The Secretary will develop and rules and regulations as may be necessary to carry out the provisions of this chapter, this is subject to influences of local, state, and federal agencies, as to include port authorities and those others interested.

- 16 U.S.C. § 1464. Authorization of appropriations
- 16 U.S.C. § 1465. Appeals to the Secretary

== Budget ==
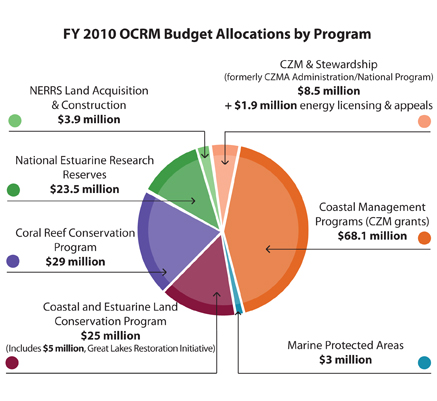
FY 2010

The Office for Coastal Management (OCM) awards four types of funding to the National CZMP. Combined, the 2011 award totaled over $65 million which supports a "variety of coastal management projects."

=== Coastal Zone Management Program ===
The four types of funding relevant to the Coastal Zone Management Programs are:

1. Administrative Grants OCM provides matching funds to states for CZMP (1:1).

2. Coastal Resource Improvement Program States may spend half of their Section 306 funds on small-scale construction or land acquisition projects, this is geared to improve “public access to the coast, facilitate redevelopment of urban waterfronts, or preserve and restore coastal resources.”

3. Coastal Zone Enhancement Grants Per Section 309, OCM provides zero match funds to state coastal zone management programs, beneficial for enhancement of the states program

4. Coastal Nonpoint Pollution Control Program (Technical Assistance) Congress matches funds to that of the States established program (1:1).

=== National Estuarine Reserve System ===
Under Section 315, the OCM provides funding to the 28 state National Estuarine Research Reserves. Funding is used for support of research, land acquisition matched (1:1), construction, education, monitoring, and graduate research fellowships.

== Coastal Zone Management Program ==
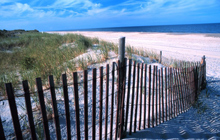
Delaware Seashore State Park.

A former participant is Alaska. The state withdrew from participation in the National Coastal Management Program on July 1, 2011. Also, while the Deepwater Port Act requires a state to have, or be making progress toward a federally approved coastal management program in order to issue a license for a facility in adjacent federal waters, it does not apply to offshore oil and gas extraction.

Current participants are

1. Alabama (1979)
2. American Samoa (1980)
3. California (1978)
4. Connecticut (1980)
5. Delaware (1979)
6. Florida (1981)
7. Georgia (1998)
8. Guam (1979)
9. Hawaii (1978)
10. Illinois (2012)
11. Indiana (2002)
12. Louisiana (1980)
13. Maine (1978)
14. Maryland (1978)
15. Massachusetts(1979)
16. Michigan (1978)
17. Minnesota (1999)
18. Mississippi (1980)
19. New Hampshire (1982)
20. New Jersey (1978)
21. New York (1982)
22. North Carolina (1978)
23. Northern Mariana Islands (1980)
24. Ohio (1997)
25. Oregon (1977)
26. Pennsylvania (1980)
27. Puerto Rico (1978)
28. Rhode Island (1978)
29. South Carolina (1979)
30. Texas (1996)
31. Virgin Islands (1979)
32. Virginia (1986)
33. Washington (1976)
34. Wisconsin (1978)

== See also ==
- Coastal States Organization
- Coastal Zone Management Program
- Integrated coastal zone management
- Monarch butterfly conservation in California
- National Estuarine Research Reserve
- List of National Estuarine Research Reserves
