= Emergent coastline =

Section of coast exposed by a relative fall in sea levels

An emergent coastline is a stretch along the coast that has been exposed by the sea by a relative fall in sea levels by either isostasy or eustasy.

Emergent coastlines are the opposite of submergent coastlines, which have experienced a relative rise in sea levels.

The emergent coastline may have several specific landforms:

- Raised beach or machair
- Wave cut platform
- Sea cave such as King's Cave, Isle of Arran

The Scottish Gaelic word machair or machar refers to a fertile low-lying raised beach found on some of the coastlines of Ireland and Scotland (especially the Outer Hebrides).

Hudson Bay, in Canada's north, is an example of an emergent coastline. It is still emerging by as much as 1 cm per year. Another example of emergent coastline is the Eastern Coastal Plains of the Indian subcontinent.
