= Coastal Zone Management Program =

The Coastal Zone Management (CZM) Program is a voluntary partnership between the United States federal government and the country's coastal and Great Lakes states and territories authorized by the Coastal Zone Management Act (CZMA) of 1972 to address national coastal issues. The Act provides the basis for protecting, restoring, and responsibly developing the United States' diverse coastal communities and resources. To meet the goals of the CZMA, the National CZM Program takes a comprehensive approach to coastal resource management— balancing the often competing and occasionally conflicting demands of coastal resource use, economic development, and conservation. Some of the key elements of the National CZM Program include protecting natural resources; managing development in high hazard areas; giving development priority to coastal-dependent uses; providing public access for recreation; and coordinating state and federal actions.

== History ==
The Coastal Zone Management Program was created by the Coastal Zone Management Act (October 27, 1972). It provides grants to eligible states and territories as an incentive to prepare and implement plans guiding the use of coastal lands and resources. Thirty-four of the 35 eligible states and territories are implementing federally approved plans. Amendments in 1990 have required participants to develop agricultural nonpoint pollution programs. These programs must specify and implement management measures to restore and protect coastal waters. Management measures are specified for erosion, sediments, nutrients, pesticides, grazing, and animal waste. Participants must implement these management measures after they have been approved by whatever means necessary, including regulation. EPA and NOAA have conditionally approved all these programs; only a few states have received final approval.

== Effectiveness ==
Since the program is voluntary, Alaska withdrew from participation on July 1, 2011.

As of 2016, the success of the Coastal Zone Management Act was mixed. Effectiveness in controlling nonpoint source pollution has been limited. The Act has not been adapted to include the effects on coastal zones of sea level rise in the United States caused by climate change. Effects of Hurricane Katrina in New Orleans in 2005 showed a lack of organization and large gaps in knowledge for decision making in local coastal zones. NOAA and EPA failed to enforce the Act in Oregon logging areas near streams since at least 2001, for which Northwest Environmental Advocates sued them; it took NOAA and EPA 15 years to deny the state of Oregon $1.2 million in federal funding.
