= EUCC – The Coastal Union Germany =

Nonprofit organization

EUCC - The Coastal Union Germany
- Founded: 2002
- Type: Non-governmental organization
- Location: Rostock-Warnemünde
- Region served: Germany, North Sea & Baltic Sea
- Method: Information retrieval and dissemination, education for sustainable development, workshops
- Members: 100 (app. 1400 Network members)
- Website: www.eucc-d.de

EUCC – The Coastal Union Germany, EUCC-Germany for short, is a nonprofit organization that supports the promotion of sustainable development of coasts and seas in national and international projects. EUCC-Germany provides learning modules and databases on the Internet, publishes information and journals and is involved in education for sustainable development (ESD) programs. As the German representative of the International Coastal & Marine Union (EUCC), the largest European non-governmental organization (NGO) in the coastal area, EUCC-Germany aims to strengthen German activities within the field of Integrated coastal zone management (ICZM) by bridging the gap between coastal science and practice.

== Overview ==
EUCC-Germany was founded in November 2002 and its main office is located in Rostock-Warnemünde on the coast of the Baltic Sea. The association currently counts with 100 members and about 1.400 network members. Main topics of the EUCC-Germany are:

- Coastal and marine management - Sustainability in the living and economic space
- Global changes - Impacts and adaptation strategies
- Education for sustainable development - Teaching and learning

== Services ==
EUCC-Germany is for all who are interested professionally or privately in the coast topic. The services of the association reach various interest groups. These particularly include coastal professionals, students and graduates, interested coastal residents and tourists. In the following, the EUCC-Germany activities are listed, which are exercised to achieve their charitable goals and tasks.

- Publication of the coastal newsletter
- Publication of projects results and scientific articles in the series Coastal Reports
- Publication of the magazine Meer & Küste
- Provision of online learning tool "IKZM-D Lernen" for creation of learning units, and provision of documents for research and educational activities on the Internet
- Provision of databases on projects, events, courses and coastal photographs
- Organization of events and realization of seminars on coastal and marine issues
- Provision of expert speakers
- Initiation of projects and dissemination of results
- Networking between organizations

== Projects ==
Since its founding in 2002, EUCC-Germany has participated in over 20 national and international projects and case studies in the field of ICZM (Integrated Coastal Zone Management). Examples are:

- RADOST (Regional adaptation strategies for the German Baltic coast)

Funded by: BMBF
Project duration: 2009-2014
EUCC-Germany tasks: coordinator of focus topic "tourism and beach management"

- ARTWEI (Action for the Reinforcement of the Transitional Waters´ Environmental Integrity)

Funded by: South Baltic Programme
Project duration: 2010-2013
EUCC-Germany tasks: Szczecin Lagoon case study: best practice management; responsible for disseminating information

- Meer im Fokus

Funded by: DBU, BINGO, Klara Samaritan Foundation
Project duration: 2010-2012
EUCC- Germany tasks: extracurricular educational activities around the Baltic Sea

- BaltCICA (Climate Change: Impacts, Costs and Adaptation in the Baltic Sea Region)

Funded by: Interreg IV b
Project duration: 2009-2012
EUCC- Germany tasks: a case study of Mecklenburg-Vorpommern: adjustments in the coastal tourism sector

- IKZM-Oder (Research for Integrated Coastal Zone Management in the Oder estuary region)

Funded by: BMBF
Project duration: 2004-2010
EUCC- Germany tasks: creation of information systems and learning modules, public relations

Further information is available on the respective Project websites.

== Organizational structure ==
The Board of EUCC-Germany is elected for four years by the General Assembly. It is composed by six members, with the federal states of Lower Saxony/Bremen, Schleswig-Holstein/Hamburg and Mecklenburg-Vorpommern with at least one representative member. Since 1 November 2006, a specialist advisory committee complemented the EUCC-Germany board. The consultants are EUCC members and renowned experts in relevant coastal fields. They assume voluntary, subject-oriented, consultative and supportive activities and participate as actively and guiding the association.
