= Fluvial sediment processes =

Sediment processes associated with rivers and streams

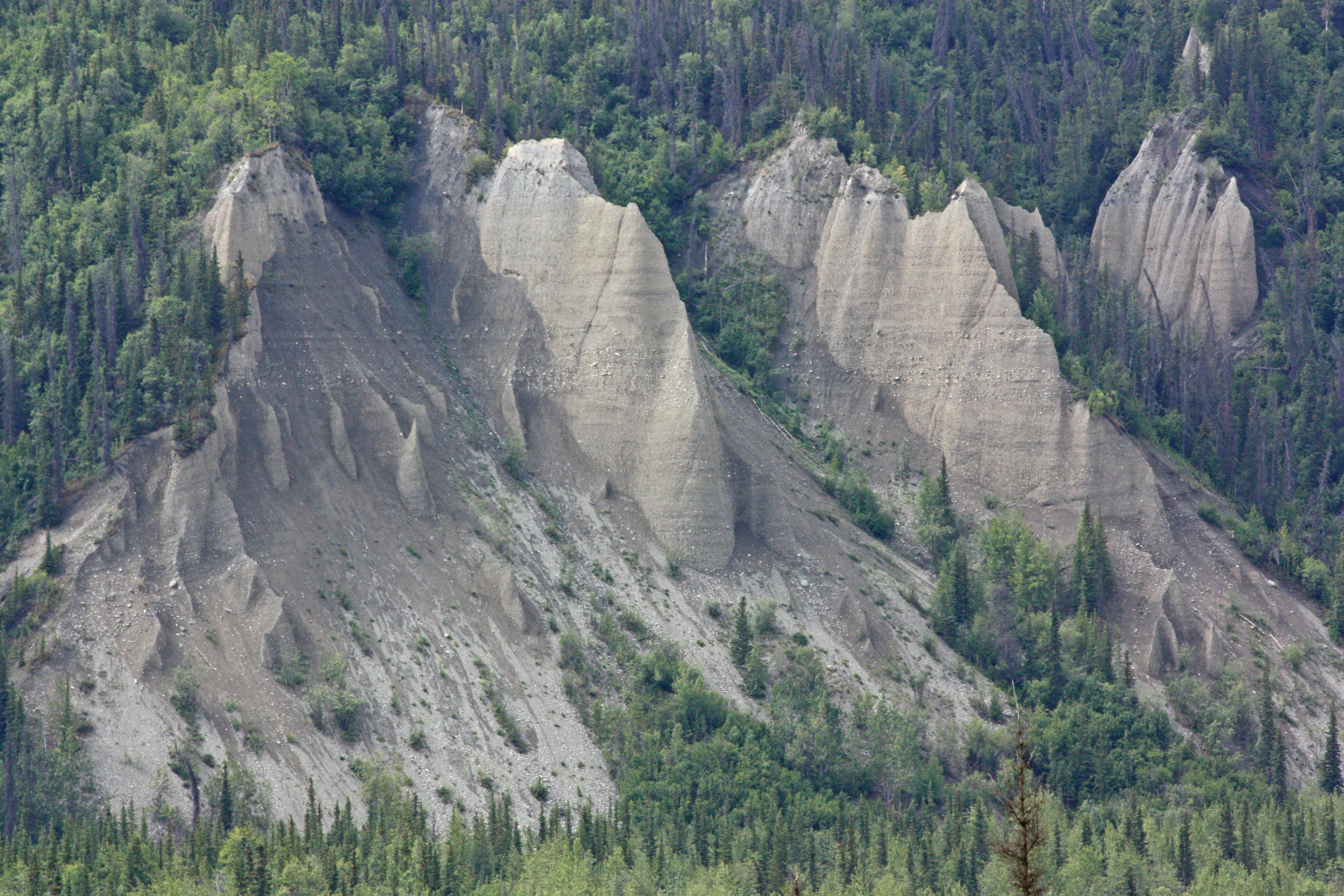
Deep, eroding glaciofluvial deposits alongside the Matanuska River, Alaska

In geography and geology, fluvial sediment processes or fluvial sediment transport are associated with rivers and streams and the deposits and landforms created by sediments. It can result in the formation of ripples and dunes, in fractal-shaped patterns of erosion, in complex patterns of natural river systems, and in the development of floodplains and the occurrence of flash floods. Sediment moved by water can be larger than sediment moved by air because water has both a higher density and viscosity. In typical rivers the largest carried sediment is of sand and gravel size, but larger floods can carry cobbles and even boulders. When the stream or rivers are associated with glaciers, ice sheets, or ice caps, the term glaciofluvial or fluvioglacial is used, as in periglacial flows and glacial lake outburst floods. Fluvial sediment processes include the motion of sediment and erosion or deposition on the river bed.

== Principles ==
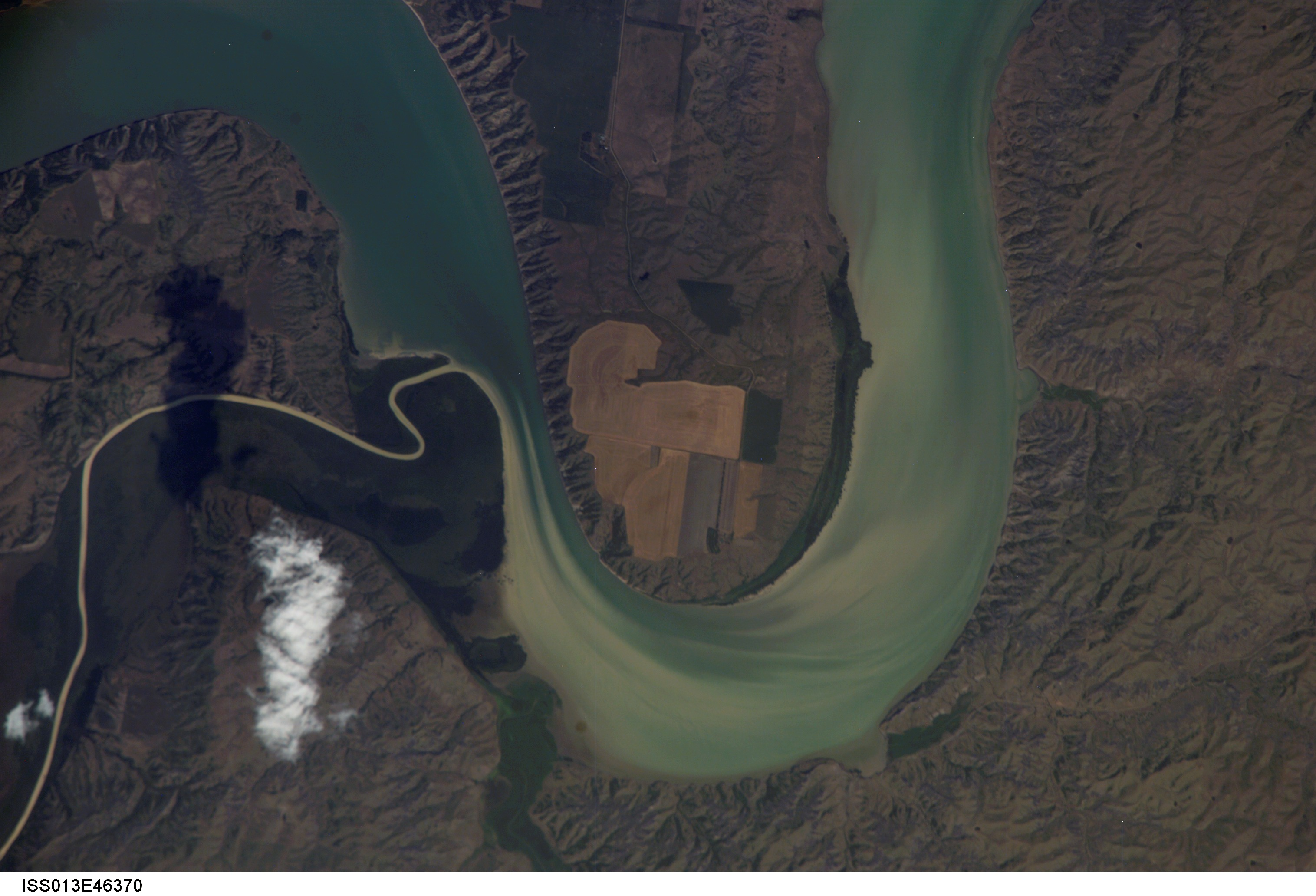
The White River is so named due to the clay it picks up in the Badlands of South Dakota. Here it flows into the Missouri River and colors it with clay.

The movement of water across the stream bed exerts a shear stress directly onto the bed. If the cohesive strength of the substrate is lower than the shear exerted, or the bed is composed of loose sediment which can be mobilized by such stresses, then the bed will be lowered purely by clearwater flow. In addition, if the river carries significant quantities of sediment, this material can act as tools to enhance wear of the bed (abrasion). At the same time the fragments themselves are ground down, becoming smaller and more rounded (attrition).

Sediment in rivers is transported as either bedload (the coarser fragments which move close to the bed) or suspended load (finer fragments carried in the water). There is also a component carried as dissolved material.

For each grain size there is a specific flow velocity at which the grains start to move, called entrainment velocity. However the grains will continue to be transported even if the velocity falls below the entrainment velocity due to the reduced (or removed) friction between the grains and the river bed. Eventually the velocity will fall low enough for the grains to be deposited. This is shown by the Hjulström curve.

A river is continually picking up and dropping solid particles of rock and soil from its bed throughout its length. Where the river flow is fast, more particles are picked up than dropped. Where the river flow is slow, more particles are dropped than picked up. Areas where more particles are dropped are called alluvial or flood plains, and the dropped particles are called alluvium.

Even small streams make alluvial deposits, but it is in floodplains and deltas of large rivers that large, geologically-significant alluvial deposits are found.

The amount of matter carried by a large river is enormous. It has been estimated that the Mississippi River annually carries 406 million tons of sediment to the sea, the Yellow River 796 million tons, and the Po River in Italy 67 million tons. The names of many rivers derive from the color that the transported matter gives the water. For example, the Yellow River (Huang He) in China is named after the hue of the sediment it carries, and the White Nile is named for the clay it carries.

== Types ==
The main kinds of fluvial processes are:

- Bradshaw model – Geographical model of river characteristics
- Corrosion – Gradual destruction of materials by chemical reaction with its environment (solution)
- Erosion – Natural processes removing soil and rock
  - Downcutting – Process of deepening a stream channel by erosion of the bottom material
- Saltation (geology) – Particle transport by fluids
- Suspension (chemistry) – Heterogeneous mixture of solid particles dispersed in a medium
- Transportation - The movement of sediment downstream via bedload, suspended load, or dissolved load.
- Deposition - The settling of sediment when the river's energy decreases.

== Depositional environments ==
The major fluvial (river and stream) depositional environments include:

- Deltas (arguably an intermediate environment between fluvial and marine)
- Point bars
- Alluvial fans
- Braided rivers
- Oxbow lakes
- Levees
- Waterfalls
- Crevasse splays
- Natural levees
- Backswamps

== Related concepts ==
=== Particle motion ===
Rivers and streams carry sediment in their flows. This sediment can be in a variety of locations within the flow, depending on the balance between the upwards velocity on the particle (drag and lift forces), and the settling velocity of the particle. These relationships are shown in the following table for the Rouse number, which is a ratio of sediment settling velocity (fall velocity) to upwards velocity.

$$\textbf{Rouse}=\frac{\text{Settling velocity}}{\text{Upwards velocity from lift and drag}}=\frac{w_s}{\kappa u_*}$$

where

- $w_s$ is the settling velocity
- $\kappa$ is the von Kármán constant
- $u_*$ is the shear velocity

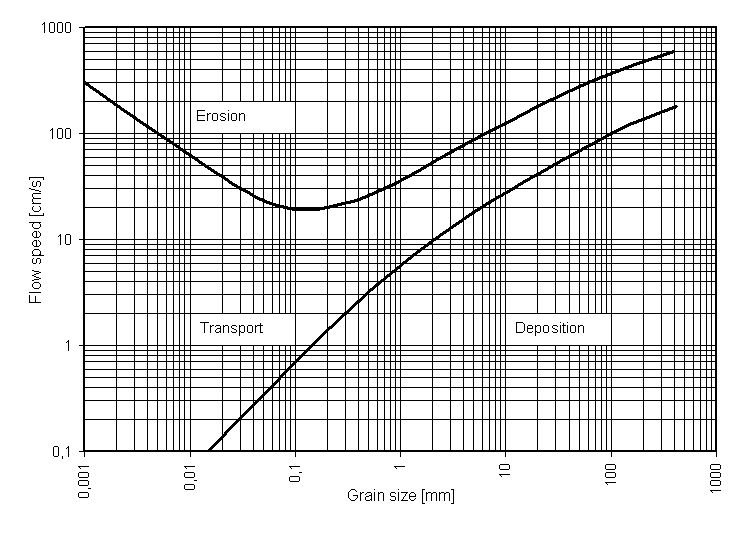
Hjulström curve: the velocities of currents required for erosion, transportation, and deposition (sedimentation) of sediment particles of different sizes

| Mode of transport | Rouse number |
|---|---|
| Bed load | >2.5 |
| Suspended load: 50% Suspended | >1.2, <2.5 |
| Suspended load: 100% Suspended | >0.8, <1.2 |
| Wash load | <0.8 |

If the upwards velocity is approximately equal to the settling velocity, sediment will be transported downstream entirely as suspended load. If the upwards velocity is much less than the settling velocity, but still high enough for the sediment to move (see Initiation of motion), it will move along the bed as bed load by rolling, sliding, and saltating (jumping up into the flow, being transported a short distance then settling again). If the upwards velocity is higher than the settling velocity, the sediment will be transported high in the flow as wash load.

As there are generally a range of different particle sizes in the flow, it is common for material of different sizes to move through all areas of the flow for given stream conditions.

=== Fluvial bedforms ===
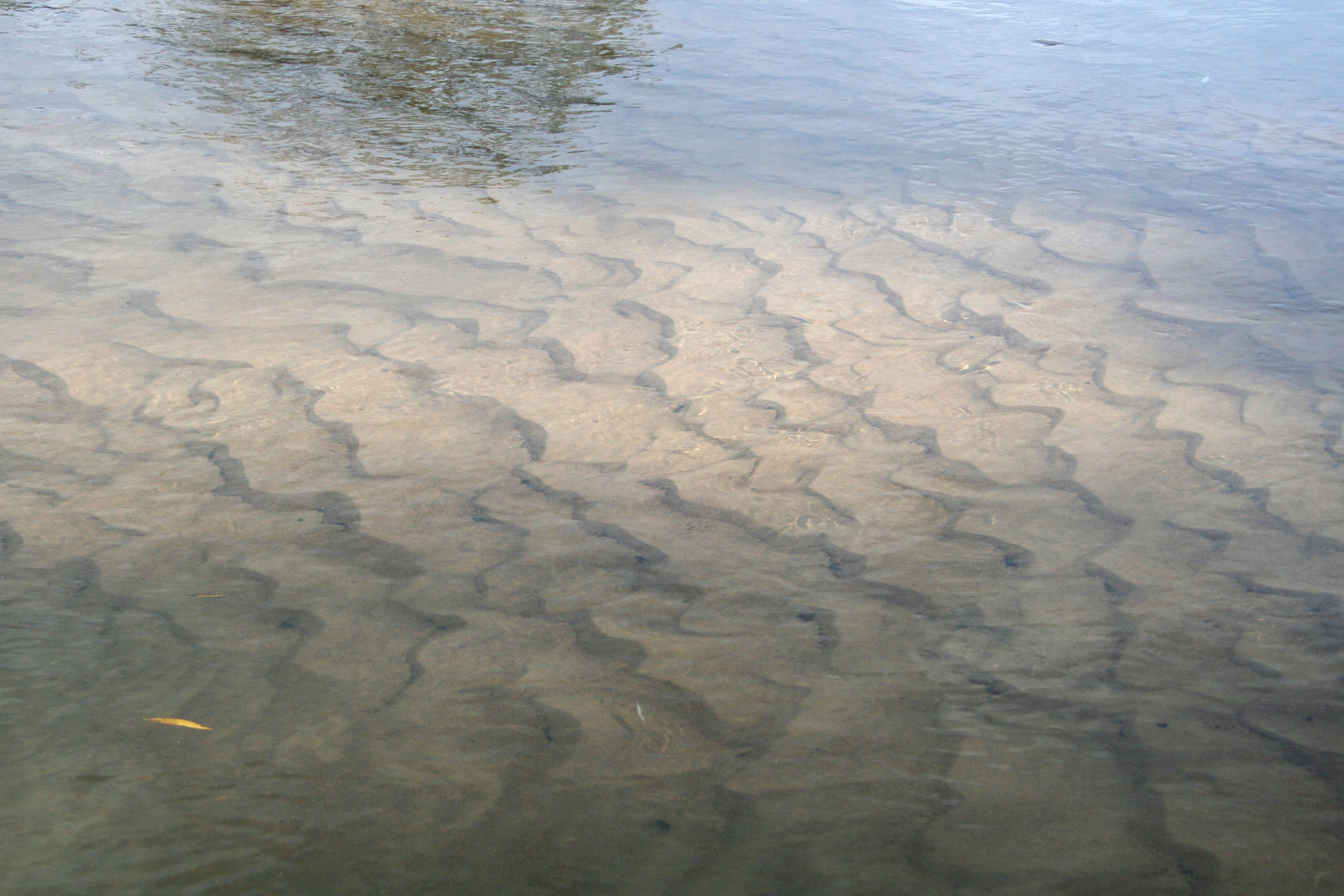
Modern asymmetric ripples developed in sand on the floor of the Hunter River, New South Wales, Australia. Flow direction is from right to left.

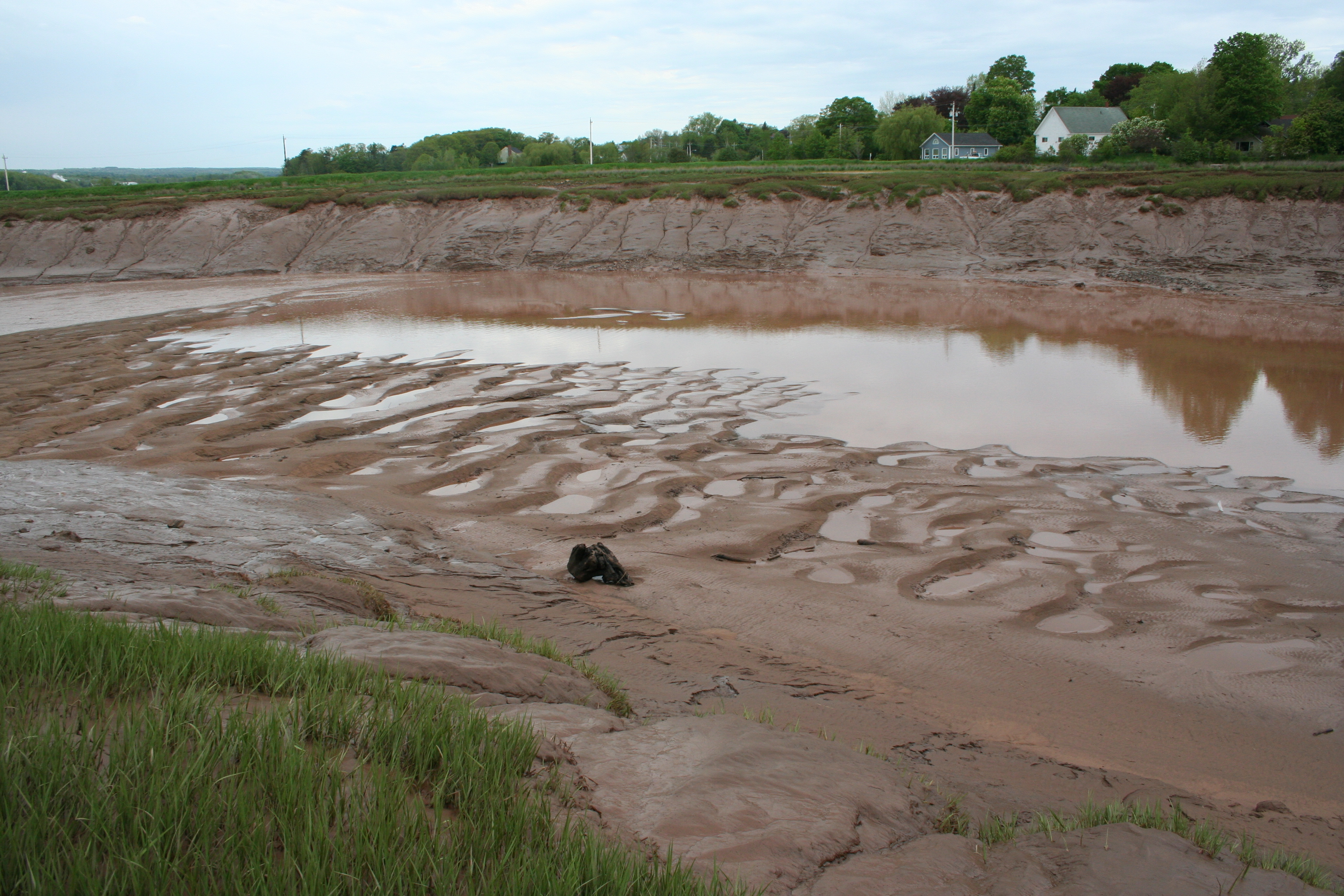
Sinuous-crested dunes exposed at low tide in the Cornwallis River near Wolfville, Nova Scotia

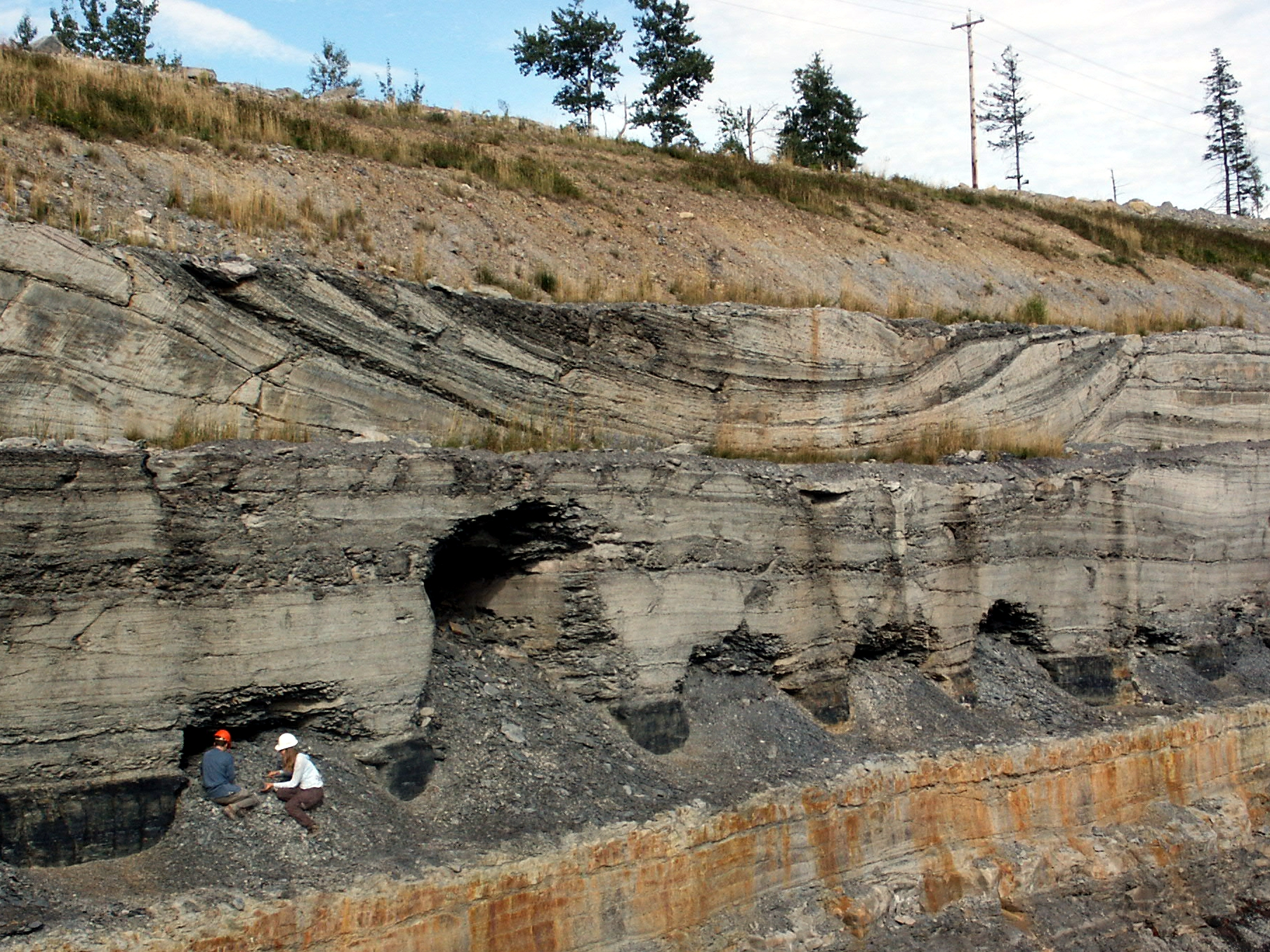
Ancient channel deposit in the Stellarton Formation (Pennsylvanian), Coalburn Pit, near Thorburn, Nova Scotia.

Sediment motion can create self-organized structures such as ripples, dunes, or antidunes on the river or stream bed. These bedforms are often preserved in sedimentary rocks and can be used to estimate the direction and magnitude of the flow that deposited the sediment.

=== Surface runoff ===
Overland flow can erode soil particles and transport them downslope. The erosion associated with overland flow may occur through different methods depending on meteorological and flow conditions.

- If the initial impact of rain droplets dislodges soil, the phenomenon is called rainsplash erosion.
- If overland flow is directly responsible for sediment entrainment but does not form gullies, it is called "sheet erosion".
- If the flow and the substrate permit channelization, gullies may form; this is termed "gully erosion".

== See also ==
- Body of water
- Channel pattern
- Sorting
- List of fluvial landforms
