= Bed material load =

Component in the load of a river system

Bed material load is one of the three components included in the load of a river system the other two being: dissolved load and wash load. The bed material load is the portion of the sediment that is transported by a stream that contains material derived from the bed. Bed material load typically consists of all of the bed load, and the proportion of the suspended load that is represented in the bed sediments. It generally consists of grains coarser than 0.062 mm with the principal source being the channel bed. Its importance lies in that its composition is that of the bed, and the material in transport can therefore be actively interchanged with the bed. For this reason, bed material load exerts a control on river channel morphology. Bed load and wash load (the sediment that rides high in the flow and does not extract non-negligible momentum from it) together constitute the total load of sediment in a stream. The order in which the three components of load have been considered – dissolved, wash, bed material – can be thought of as progression: of increasingly slower transport velocities, so that the load peak lags further and further behind the flow peak during any event.

== Sediment Transport ==
Bed-material load is composed of larger grains than any of the other loads. The rate in which grains travel is dependent on the transporting capacity of the flow. Particles move by rolling, sliding, or saltation (bouncing or jumping of grains) at velocities less than that of the surrounding flow. Rolling is the primary mode of transport in gravel-bed streams, while saltation in which grains hop over the bed in a series of low trajectories is largely restricted to sands and small gravels. Various equations are used to estimate the rate at which sediments are transported through the fluvial system. Bed-material discharge equations generally are applicable only within the range of flow conditions and sediment sizes for which the equations were derived. Variables used to characterize the bed material load transport as described by Kumar (2012) are as follows:

– Channel geometry: b (width of the channel), y (flow depth) and BF (bed form of the channel)

– Dynamic properties: Q\ (channel discharge), Sf (friction/energy slope), τb (bed shear stress) and τc (critical shear stress or Shields’ shear stress)

– Sediment properties: d (mean size of sediment), σ (gradation coefficient of the sediment particles) and Gs (specific gravity)

– Fluid properties: ν (viscosity)

Bed material load transport (C) is a function of all the above parameters, i.e.:

C = f (b, y, BF, Q, Sf, τb, τc, d, σ,Gs, ν)

Knowledge of sediment transport is important to such endeavors as river restoration, ecosystem protection, navigation, and infrastructure management.

== Measurements ==
Direct and indirect methods are two ways in which bed material can be measured. Direct measurement is done through the use of a physical trap, placing the device in contact with the bed, “allowing the sediment transported as bedload to accumulate (or be trapped) inside the sampler for a certain amount of time, after which the sampler is raised to the surface and the material is emptied and weighed to determine a weight transported per unit time." There are three types of direct samplers, which include a box or basket, pan or tray, and pressure difference as described by Hubbell (1964). Measurements of bedload discharge are rare and frequently of unknown accuracy because no bedload sampler has been extensively tested and calibrated over a wide range of hydraulic conditions. The box sampler has an opening that allows sediment to enter, the pan or tray samplers are placed in front of the open front of a box, and the pressure difference sampler is made to produce a pressure drop at the end of the nozzle. Accurate field measurements are very difficult to make, errors principally associated with the measuring devices themselves and with the extreme temporal variations in transport rate, which are a characteristic feature of bed material movement. Indirect measurements can be performed by a tracer, repeated channel surveys, bedform velocimetry, or velocimetry. No one method is entirely satisfactory, but indirect channel surveys, provided they are detailed enough at the reach scale, can produce reliable results, and have the advantages of minimum disturbance to the flow and time-integrated sampling which averages out short-term fluctuations in the transport rate.

== Importance ==
Bed-material exerts a control on river channel morphology. The bed material load transport in alluvial rivers is the principal link between river hydraulics and river form and is responsible for building and maintaining the channel geometry.
