= Stream load =

Streams such as this carry solid material as a result of erosion.

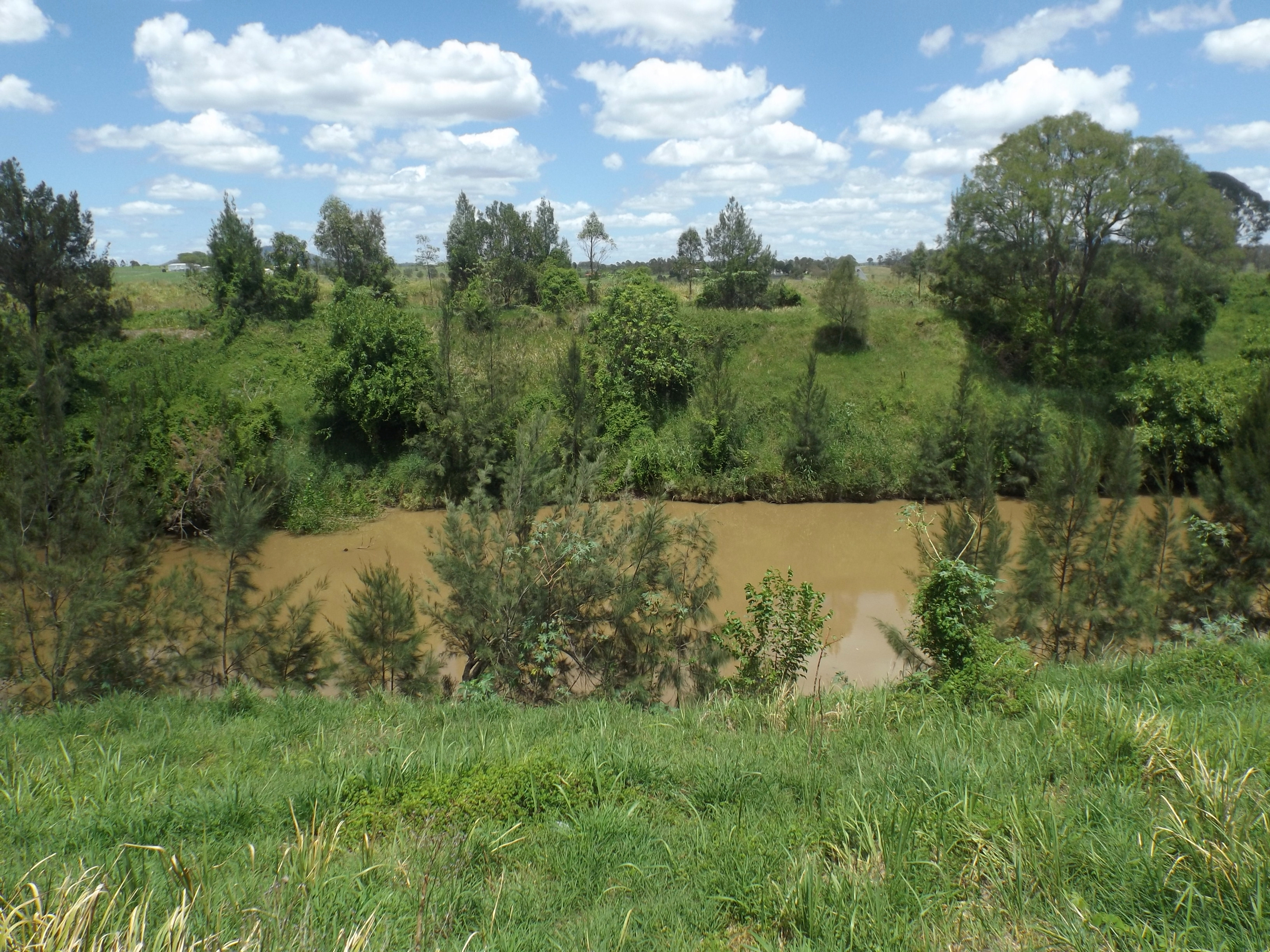
A high level of sediment in the Logan River due to thunderstorm activity

Stream load is a geologic term referring to the solid matter carried by a stream (Strahler and Strahler, 2006). Erosion and bed shear stress continually remove mineral material from the bed and banks of the stream channel, adding this material to the regular flow of water. The amount of solid load that a stream can carry, or stream capacity, is measured in metric tons per day, passing a given location. Stream capacity is dependent upon the stream's velocity, the amount of water flow, and the gradation (because streams that occur on steeper slopes tend to have greater flow and velocity) (Strahler and Strahler, 2006).

== Types of stream erosion ==
There are two main sources of stream erosion: hydraulic action and abrasion. All of the materials added to normal stream flow through these processes increase the overall stream load (Strahler and Strahler, 2006).

=== Hydraulic action ===
Hydraulic action describes the erosion caused by the dragging of water over the stream bed and bank. This dragging, coupled with the impact of small parties, easily loosens and erodes smaller alluvial matter, such as gravel, sand, silt and clay (Mangelsdorf, 1990). One powerful example of hydraulic action is bank caving, which normally occurs when a stream loosens sediment and undercuts a bank. Consequently, large masses of sediment slump and collapse into the stream, adding significantly to the stream's load (Strahler and Strahler, 2006). The severity of hydraulic action increases with stream velocity and current stream load.

=== Abrasion ===
Abrasion occurs when larger rock particles roll and strike against bedrock walls, chipping and splintering particles and pieces of rock (Strahler and Strahler). As these cobbles and boulders roll across the stream bed, they continue to crush and grind the bedrock, producing an assortment of eroded rock sizes (Ritter, 2006). Again, the severity of this type of erosion is dependent upon stream velocity and stream load (i.e. the presence of larger rock particles)..

== Types of stream load ==
Mineral materials of many different shapes and particle sizes erode and contribute to overall stream load. Differences in the size of those materials determine how they will be transported down stream. Stream load is broken into three types: dissolved load, suspended load, and bed load (Ritter, 2006).

=== Dissolved load ===
Dissolved matter is invisible, and is transported in the form of chemical ions. All streams carry some type of dissolved load. This type of load can result from mineral alteration from chemical erosion, or may even be the result of groundwater seepage into the stream. Materials comprising the dissolved load have the smallest particle size of the three load types (Strahler and Strahler, 2006).

=== Suspended load ===
Suspended load is composed of fine sediment particles suspended and transported through the stream. These materials are too large to be dissolved, but too small to lie on the bed of the stream (Mangelsdorf, 1990). Stream flow keeps these suspended materials, such as clay and silt, from settling on the stream bed. Suspended load is the result of material eroded by hydraulic action at the stream surface bordering the channel as well as erosion of the channel itself. Suspended load accounts for the largest majority of stream load (Strahler and Strahler, 2006).

=== Bed load ===
Bed load rolls slowly along the floor of the stream. These include the largest and heaviest materials in the stream, ranging from sand and gravel to cobbles and boulders. There are two main ways to transport bed load: traction and saltation. Traction describes the “scooting and rolling” of particles along the bed (Ritter, 2006). In stream load transport, saltation is a bounce-like movement, occurring when large particles are suspended in the stream for a short distance after which they fall to the bed, dislodging particles from the house. The dislodged particles move downstream a short distance where they fall to the bed, again loosening bed load particles upon impact (Ritter, 2006).

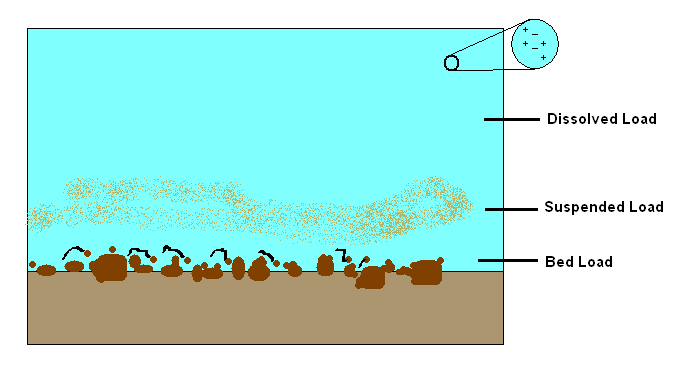
Dissolved and suspended load move with the natural stream flow, while the heavier bed load rolls across the floor of the stream.

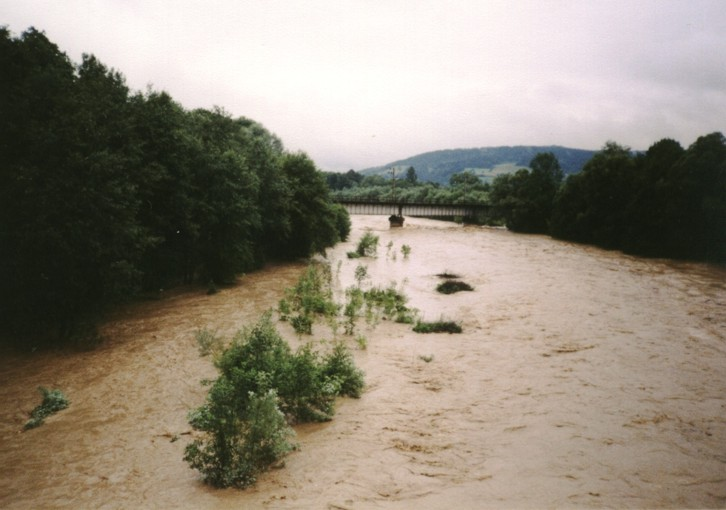
Increased suspended load gives this flooded stream its muddy color.

== Flood and stream load ==
Floods create a scenario in which stream flow and velocity are unusually high due to the drastic addition of water to a stream. These heightened characteristics increase both the potential of stream erosion and heavier stream load (Knighton, 1998). Flooded streams are often responsible for heavy sediment transportation and deposition downstream. Stream capacity is greatly increased during a flood (Knighton, 1998). During a flood, increased suspended load may be visible, giving the stream a muddy color.

== See also ==
- Rouse number
- Sediment
- Sediment transport
- Wash load
