= Stream capacity =

Total amount of sediment a stream can transport

The capacity of a stream or river is the total amount of sediment a stream is able to transport. This measurement usually corresponds to the stream power and the width-integrated bed shear stress across section along a stream profile. Note that capacity is greater than the load, which is the amount of sediment carried by the stream. Load is generally limited by the sediment available upstream.

Stream capacity is often mistaken for the stream competency, which is a measure of the maximum size of the particles that the stream can transport, or for the total load, which is the load that a stream carries.

The sediment transported by the stream depends upon the intensity of rainfall and land characteristics.

== See also ==
- Bed load
- Sediment transport
- Suspended load
- Wash load
