= Denudation =

Processes of wearing away landforms

Denudation is the geological process in which moving water, ice, wind, and waves erode the Earth's surface, leading to a reduction in elevation and in relief of landforms and landscapes. Although the terms erosion and denudation are used interchangeably, erosion is the transport of soil and rocks from one location to another, and denudation is the sum of processes, including erosion, that result in the lowering of Earth's surface. Endogenous processes such as volcanoes, earthquakes, and tectonic uplift can expose continental crust to the exogenous processes of weathering, erosion, and mass wasting. The effects of denudation have been recorded for millennia but the mechanics behind it have been debated for the past 200 years and have only begun to be understood in the past few decades.

== Description ==
Denudation incorporates the mechanical, biological, and chemical processes of erosion, weathering, and mass wasting. Denudation can involve the removal of both solid particles and dissolved material. These include sub-processes of cryofracture, insolation weathering, slaking, salt weathering, bioturbation, and anthropogenic impacts.

Factors affecting denudation include:

- Anthropogenic (human) activity, including agriculture, damming, mining, and deforestation;
- Biosphere, via animals, plants, and microorganisms contributing to chemical and physical weathering;
- Climate, most directly through chemical weathering from rain, but also because climate dictates what kind of weathering occurs;
- Lithology or the type of rock;
- Surface topography and changes to surface topography, such as mass wasting and erosion; and
- Tectonic activity, such as deformation, the changing of rocks due to stress mainly from tectonic forces, and orogeny, the process that forms mountains.

== Historical theories ==
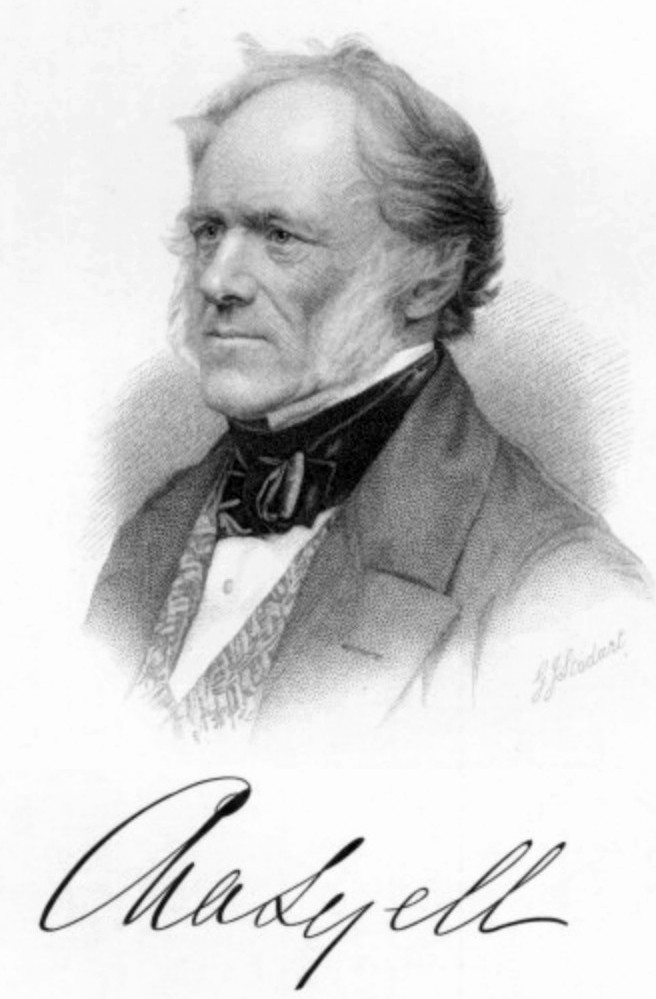
Charles Lyell, author of Principles of Geology, who established within the scientific community the concept of denudation and that idea that the surface of the Earth is shaped by gradual processes.

The effects of denudation have been written about since antiquity, although the terms "denudation" and "erosion" have been used interchangeably throughout most of history. In the Age of Enlightenment, scholars began trying to understand how denudation and erosion occurred without mythical or biblical explanations. Throughout the 18th century, scientists theorized valleys are formed by streams running through them, not from floods or other cataclysms. In 1785, Scottish physician James Hutton proposed an Earth history based on observable processes over an unlimited amount of time, which marked a shift from assumptions based on faith to reasoning based on logic and observation. In 1802, John Playfair, a friend of Hutton, published a paper clarifying Hutton's ideas, explaining the basic process of water wearing down the Earth's surface, and describing erosion and chemical weathering. Between 1830 and 1833, Charles Lyell published three volumes of Principles of Geology, which describes the shaping of the surface of Earth by ongoing processes, and which endorsed and established gradual denudation in the wider scientific community.

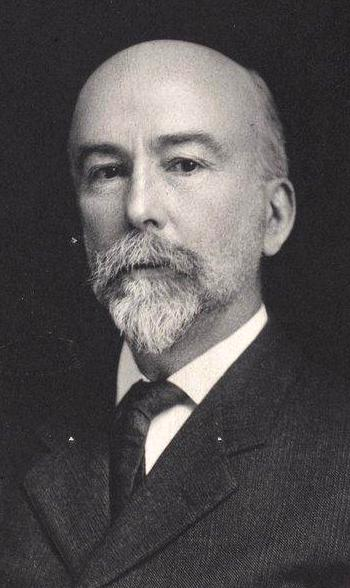
W.M. Davis, the man who proposed the peneplanation cycle.

As denudation came into the wider conscience, questions of how denudation occurs and what the result is began arising. Hutton and Playfair suggested over a period of time, a landscape would eventually be worn down to erosional planes at or near sea level, which gave the theory the name "planation". Charles Lyell proposed marine planation, oceans, and ancient shallow seas were the primary driving force behind denudation. While surprising given the centuries of observation of fluvial and pluvial erosion, this is more understandable given early geomorphology was largely developed in Britain, where the effects of coastal erosion are more evident and play a larger role in geomorphic processes. There was more evidence against marine planation than there was for it. By the 1860s, marine planation had largely fallen from favor, a move led by Andrew Ramsay, a former proponent of marine planation who recognized rain and rivers play a more important role in denudation. In North America during the mid-19th century, advancements in identifying fluvial, pluvial, and glacial erosion were made. The work being done in the Appalachians and American West that formed the basis for William Morris Davis to hypothesize peneplanation, despite the fact while peneplanation was compatible in the Appalachians, it did not work as well in the more active American West. Peneplanation was a cycle in which young landscapes are produced by uplift and denuded down to sea level, which is the base level. The process would be restarted when the old landscape was uplifted again or when the base level was lowered, producing a new, young landscape.

Publication of the Davisian cycle of erosion caused many geologists to begin looking for evidence of planation around the world. Unsatisfied with Davis's cycle due to evidence from the Western United States, Grove Karl Gilbert suggested backwearing of slopes would shape landscapes into pediplains, and W.J. McGee named these landscapes pediments. This later gave the concept the name pediplanation when L.C. King applied it on a global scale. The dominance of the Davisian cycle gave rise to several theories to explain planation, such as eolation and glacial planation, although only etchplanation survived time and scrutiny because it was based on observations and measurements done in different climates around the world and it also explained irregularities in landscapes. The majority of these concepts failed, partly because Joseph Jukes, a popular geologist and professor, separated denudation and uplift in an 1862 publication that had a lasting impact on geomorphology. These concepts also failed because the cycles, Davis's in particular, were generalizations and based on broad observations of the landscape rather than detailed measurements; many of the concepts were developed based on local or specific processes, not regional processes, and they assumed long periods of continental stability.

Some scientists opposed the Davisian cycle; one was Grove Karl Gilbert, who, based on measurements over time, realized denudation is nonlinear; he started developing theories based on fluid dynamics and equilibrium concepts. Another was Walther Penck, who devised a more complex theory that denudation and uplift occurred at the same time, and that landscape formation is based on the ratio between denudation and uplift rates. His theory proposed geomorphology is based on endogenous and exogenous processes. Penck's theory, while ultimately being ignored, returned to denudation and uplift occurring simultaneously and relying on continental mobility, even though Penck rejected continental drift. The Davisian and Penckian models were heavily debated for a few decades until Penck's was ignored and support for Davis's waned after his death as more critiques were made. One critic was John Leighly, who stated geologists did not know how landforms were developed, so Davis's theory was built upon a shaky foundation.

From 1945 to 1965, a change in geomorphology research saw a shift from mostly deductive work to detailed experimental designs that used improved technologies and techniques, although this led to research over details of established theories, rather than researching new theories. Through the 1950s and 1960s, as improvements were made in ocean geology and geophysics, it became clearer Wegener's theory on continental drift was correct and that there is constant movement of parts (the plates) of Earth's surface. Improvements were also made in geomorphology to quantify slope forms and drainage networks, and to find relationships between the form and process, and the magnitude and frequency of geomorphic processes. The final blow to peneplanation came in 1964 when a team led by Luna Leopold published Fluvial Processes in Geomorphology, which links landforms with measurable precipitation-infiltration runoff processes and concluded no peneplains exist over large areas in modern times, and any historical peneplains would have to be proven to exist, rather than inferred from modern geology. They also stated pediments could form across all rock types and regions, although through different processes. Through these findings and improvements in geophysics, the study of denudation shifted from planation to studying which relationships affect denudation–including uplift, isostasy, lithology, and vegetation–and measuring denudation rates around the world.

== Measurement ==
Denudation is measured in the wearing down of Earth's surface in inches or centimeters per 1000 years. This rate is intended as an estimate and often assumes uniform erosion, among other things, to simplify calculations. Assumptions made are often only valid for the landscapes being studied. Measurements of denudation over large areas are performed by averaging the rates of subdivisions. Often, no adjustments are made for human impact, which causes the measurements to be inflated. Calculations have suggested soil loss of up to 0.5 metres (20 in) caused by human activity will change previously calculated denudation rates by less than 30%.

Denudation rates are usually much lower than the rates of uplift and average orogeny rates can be eight times the maximum average denudation. The only areas at which there could be equal rates of denudation and uplift are active plate margins with an extended period of continuous deformation.

Denudation is measured in catchment-scale measurements and can use other erosion measurements, which are generally split into dating and survey methods. Techniques for measuring erosion and denudation include stream load measurement, cosmogenic exposure and burial dating, erosion tracking, topographic measurements, surveying the deposition in reservoirs, landslide mapping, chemical fingerprinting, thermochronology, and analysis of sedimentary records in deposition areas. The most common way of measuring denudation is from stream load measurements taken at gauging stations. The suspended load, bed load, and dissolved load are included in measurements. The weight of the load is converted to volumetric units and the load volume is divided by the area of the watershed above the gauging station. An issue with this method of measurement is the high annual variation in fluvial erosion, which can be up to a factor of five between successive years. An important equation for denudation is the stream power law: $E=KA^mS^n$, where E is erosion rate, K is the erodibility constant, A is drainage area, S is channel gradient, and m and n are functions that are usually given beforehand or assumed based on the location. Most denudation measurements are based on stream load measurements and analysis of the sediment or the water chemistry.

A more recent technique is cosmogenic isotope analysis, which is used in conjunction with stream load measurements and sediment analysis. This technique measures chemical weathering intensity by calculating chemical alteration in molecular proportions. Preliminary research into using cosmogenic isotopes to measure weathering was done by studying the weathering of feldspar and volcanic glass, which contain most of the material found in the Earth's upper crust. The most common isotopes used are ^{26}Al and ^{10}Be; however, ^{10}Be is used more often in these analyses. ^{10}Be is used due to its abundance and, while it is not stable, its half-life of 1.39 million years is relatively stable compared to the thousand or million-year scale in which denudation is measured. ^{26}Al is used because of the low presence of Al in quartz, making it easy to separate, and because there is no risk of contamination of atmospheric ^{10}Be. This technique was developed because previous denudation-rate studies assumed steady rates of erosion even though such uniformity is difficult to verify in the field and may be invalid for many landscapes; its use to help measure denudation and geologically date events was important. On average, the concentration of undisturbed cosmogenic isotopes in sediment leaving a particular basin is inversely related to the rate at which that basin is eroding. In a rapidly-eroding basin, most rock will be exposed to only a small number of cosmic rays before erosion and transport out of the basin; as a result, isotope concentration will be low. In a slowly-eroding basin, integrated cosmic ray exposure is much greater and isotope concentration will be much higher. Measuring isotopic reservoirs in most areas is difficult with this technique so uniform erosion is assumed. There is also variation in year-to-year measurements, which can be as high as a factor of three.

Problems in measuring denudation include both the technology used and the environment. Landslides can interfere with denudation measurements in mountainous regions, especially the Himalayas. The two main problems with dating methods are uncertainties in the measurements, both with equipment used and with assumptions made during measurement; and the relationship between the measured ages and histories of the markers. This relates to the problem of making assumptions based on the measurements being made and the area being measured. Environmental factors such as temperature, atmospheric pressure, humidity, elevation, wind, the speed of light at higher elevations if using lasers or time of flight measurements, instrument drift, chemical erosion, and for cosmogenic isotopes, climate and snow or glacier coverage. When studying denudation, the Stadler effect, which states that measurements over short time periods show higher accumulation rates than measurements over longer time periods, should be considered. In a study by James Gilully, the presented data suggested the denudation rate has stayed roughly the same throughout the Cenozoic era based on geological evidence; however, given estimates of denudation rates at the time of Gilully's study and the United States' elevation, it would take 11-12 million years to erode North America; well before the 66 million years of the Cenozoic.

The research on denudation is primarily done in river basins and in mountainous regions like the Himalayas because these are very geologically active regions, which allows for research between uplift and denudation. There is also research on the effects of denudation on karst because only about 30% of chemical weathering from water occurs on the surface. Denudation has a large impact on karst and landscape evolution because the most-rapid changes to landscapes occur when there are changes to subterranean structures. Other research includes effects on denudation rates; this research is mostly studying how climate and vegetation impact denudation. Research is also being done to find the relationship between denudation and isostasy; the more denudation occurs, the lighter the crust becomes in an area, which allows for uplift. The work is primarily trying to determine a ratio between denudation and uplift so better estimates can be made on changes in the landscape. In 2016 and 2019, research that attempted to apply denudation rates to improve the stream power law so it can be used more effectively was conducted.

== Examples ==
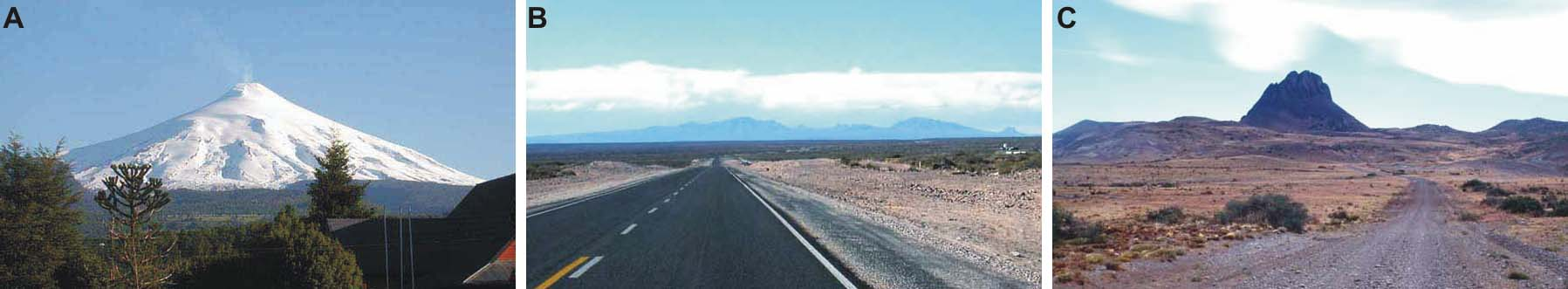
A) Villarrica Volcano, Chile, a volcano without effects of erosion and denudation B) Chachahén Volcano, Mendoza Province, Argentina, a volcano with strong effects of erosion but no denudation C) Cardiel Lake, Santa Cruz Province, Argentina, a volcanic area with strong effects of denudation, exposing subvolcanic rock body.

Denudation exposes deep subvolcanic structures on the present surface of the area where volcanic activity once occurred. Subvolcanic structures such as volcanic plugs and dikes are exposed by denudation.

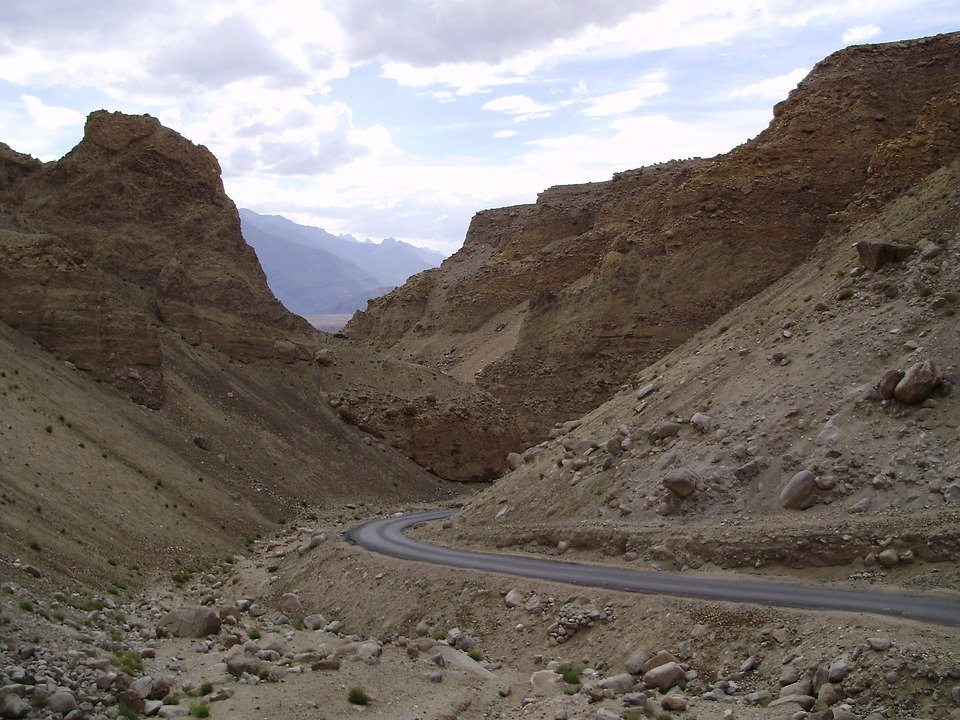
A mountain road in Ladakh that shows signs of mass wasting and erosion that result in bedrock exposure.

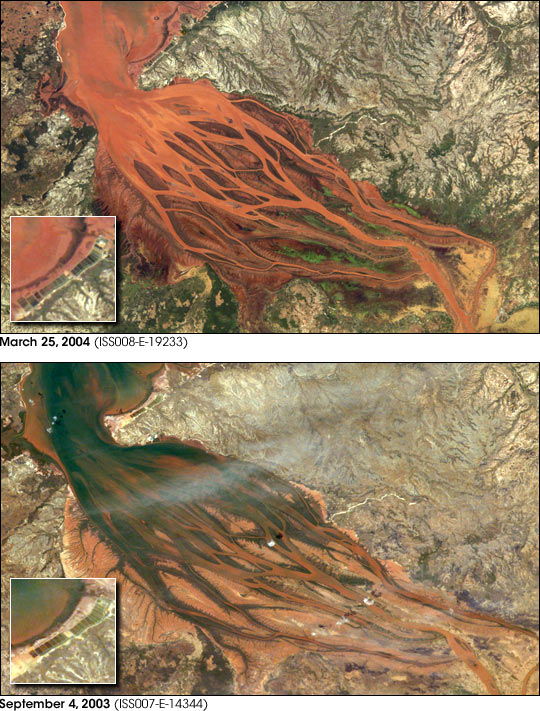
Satellite images that show the extreme erosion in the Betsiboka Estuary in Madagascar due to deforestation, which results in rapid denudation and one of the fastest changing coastlines.

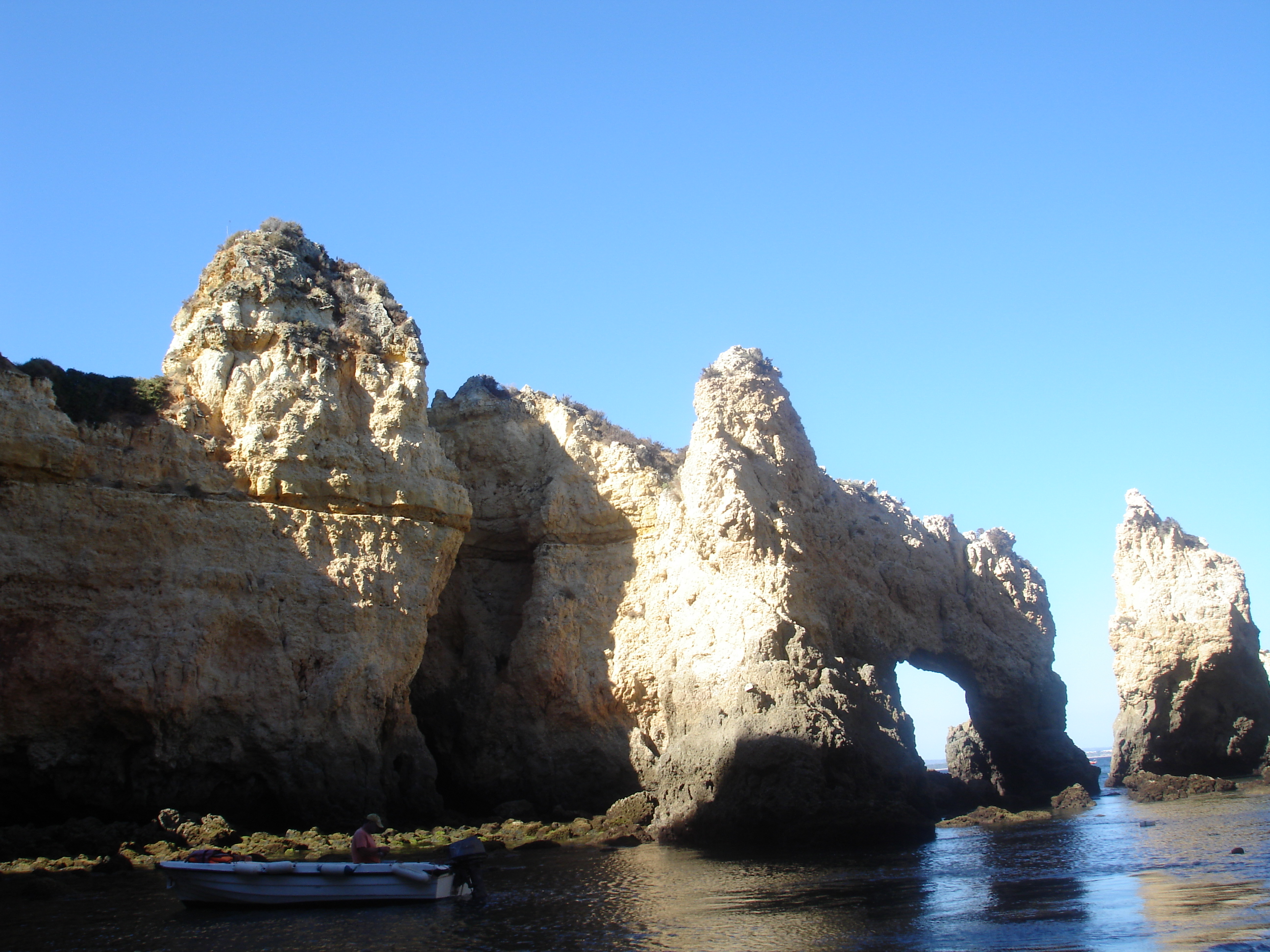
Cliffs of a coastline in Portugal that have denuded due to erosion and weathering primarily from water and salt.

Other examples include:

- Earthquakes causing landslides;
- Haloclasty, the build-up of salt in cracks in rocks leading to erosion and weathering;
- Ice accumulating in the cracks of rocks; and
- Microorganisms contributing to weathering through cellular respiration.
