= Dissolved load =

Sediment dissolved in water

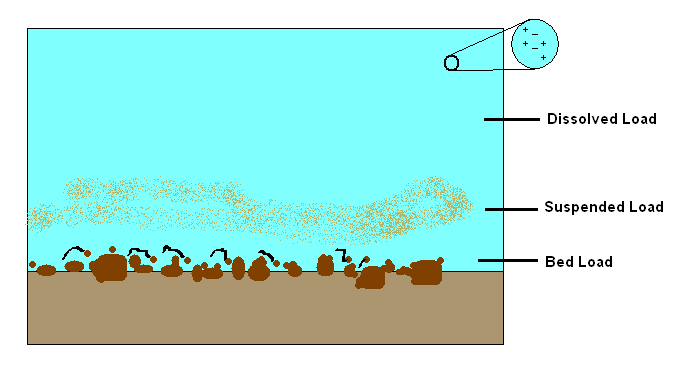
Dissolved load is one of three types of stream load, along with suspended load and bed load.

Dissolved load is the portion of a stream's total sediment load that is carried in solution, especially ions from chemical weathering. It is a major contributor to the total amount of material removed from a river's drainage basin, along with suspended load and bed load. The amount of material carried as dissolved load is typically much smaller than the suspended load, though this is not always the case, particularly when the available river flow is mostly harnessed for purposes such as irrigation or industrial uses. Dissolved load comprises a significant portion of the total material flux out of a landscape, and its composition is important in regulating the chemistry and biology of the stream water.

The dissolved load is primarily controlled by the rate of chemical weathering, which depends on climate and weather conditions such as moisture and temperature. Dissolved load has many useful applications within the field of geology, including erosion, denudation, and reconstructing climate in the past.

== Measurement techniques ==
Dissolved load is typically measured by taking samples of water from a river and running various scientific tests on them. First, the pH, conductivity, and bicarbonate alkalinity of the sample are measured. Next, samples are filtered to remove any suspended sediments and preserved with chloroform to prevent growth of microorganisms, while the others are acidified with hydrochloric acid added to keep dissolved ions from precipitating out of solution. Then, various chemical tests are applied to determine the concentration of each solute. For example, the concentrations of sodium and potassium ions can be determined by flame photometry, while the calcium and magnesium ion concentrations can be determined by atomic absorption spectrophotometry.

== Applications ==
=== Reconstructing climate ===
Dissolved load can provide valuable information about the rate of soil formation and other processes of chemical erosion. In particular, the mass balance between the dissolved load and solid phase is helpful in determining surface dynamics. In addition, dissolved load can be used to reconstruct the climate of the Earth in the past. This is because chemical weathering is the major contributor to the dissolved load of a stream. The chemical weathering of silicate rocks is the primary sink for carbon dioxide in the atmosphere, because atmospheric carbon dioxide is converted into carbonate rocks in the carbonate–silicate cycle. Carbon dioxide concentrations are the primary control of the greenhouse effect, which determines the temperature of the Earth.

=== Denudation ===
Denudation is the process of wearing away the top layers of Earth's landscape. Because the denudation rate is normally too low to measure directly, it can be indirectly determined by measuring the sediment load of the streams that drain the area in question. This is possible because any material that passes through a certain point on a stream is guaranteed to have come from somewhere in the stream's drainage basin upstream of that point. As topographic relief increases, the dissolved load's contribution to the total stream load decreases because on steeper surfaces, rain is less likely to infiltrate the rocks, leading to less chemical weathering, which decreases the dissolved load.

=== Salt export ===
The process of carrying salts by water to the sea or a land-locked lake from a river basin is called salt export. When adequate salt export is not occurring, the river basin area gradually converts into saline soils and/or alkali soils, particularly in lower reaches.

== Dissolved loads of selected major rivers ==
Dissolved loads of selected major world rivers
River	Drainage area, 10^{6} km^{2}	Discharge, 10^{9} m^{3}/yr	Total dissolved solids (TDS), 10^{6} tonnes/yr
Xijiang	0.35	30	10.14
Changjiang	1.95	1063	226
Huanghe	0.745	48	84
Ganges-Brahmaputra	1.48	1071	129.5
Lena	2.44	532	50.6
Amazon	4.69	6930	324.6
Orinoco	1.00	1100	51.3
Krishna	0.251	30	10.4
Godavari	0.31	92	17
Kaveri	0.09	21	3.5
Ganges	0.75	493	84
World total	101	37000	3843.0

== See also ==
- Bed load
- Rouse number
- Sediment
- Sediment transport
- Stream load
- Wash load
- List of drainage basins by area
- List of rivers by discharge
- Freshwater salinization
