= Submerged specific gravity =

Measure of an object's buoyancy when immersed in fluid

Submerged specific gravity is a dimensionless measure of an object's buoyancy when immersed in a fluid. It can be expressed in terms of the equation

$$\text{SSG} = \frac{\rho_o - \rho_f}{\rho_f}$$

where $\text{SSG}$ stands for "submerged specific gravity", $\rho_o$ is the density of the object, and $\rho_f$ is the density of the fluid.

Submerged specific gravity is equal to the specific gravity given by the ratio of the weight of the object to the weight of the fluid minus one. That is, the object and fluid have the same density when the specific gravity equals one, and the submerged specific gravity equals zero. This fact highlights the utility of the usage of submerged specific gravity in problems involving buoyancy and force balances on submerged objects: the object will naturally rise when its submerged specific gravity is negative, and sink when its submerged specific gravity is positive.

Because of this characteristic and its dimensionless nature, submerged specific gravity is ubiquitous in equations of sediment transport.
