= Sediment transport =

Movement of solid particles, typically by gravity and fluid entrainment

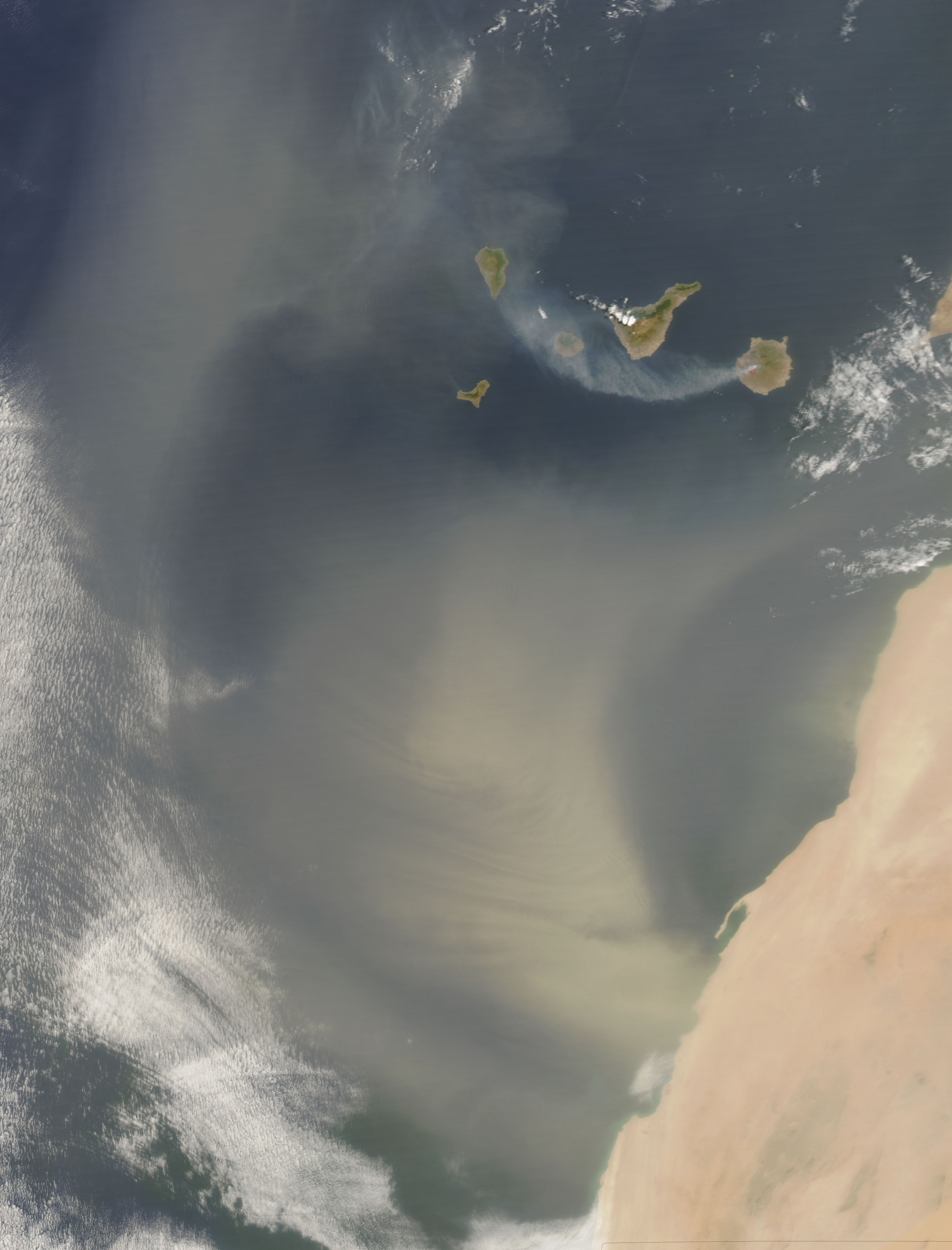
Dust blowing from the Sahara Desert over the Atlantic Ocean towards the Canary Islands

Sediment transport is the movement of solid particles (sediment), typically due to a combination of gravity acting on the sediment, and the movement of the fluid in which the sediment is entrained. Sediment transport occurs in natural systems where the particles are clastic rocks (sand, gravel, boulders, etc.), mud, or clay; the fluid is air, water, or ice; and the force of gravity acts to move the particles along the sloping surface on which they are resting. Sediment transport due to fluid motion occurs in rivers, oceans, lakes, seas, and other bodies of water due to currents and tides. Transport is also caused by glaciers as they flow, and on terrestrial surfaces under the influence of wind. Sediment transport due only to gravity can occur on sloping surfaces in general, including hillslopes, scarps, cliffs, and the continental shelf—continental slope boundary.

Sediment transport is important in the fields of sedimentary geology, geomorphology, civil engineering, hydraulic engineering and environmental engineering (see applications, below). Knowledge of sediment transport is most often used to determine whether erosion or deposition will occur, the magnitude of this erosion or deposition, and the time and distance over which it will occur.

== Environments ==
=== Aeolian ===
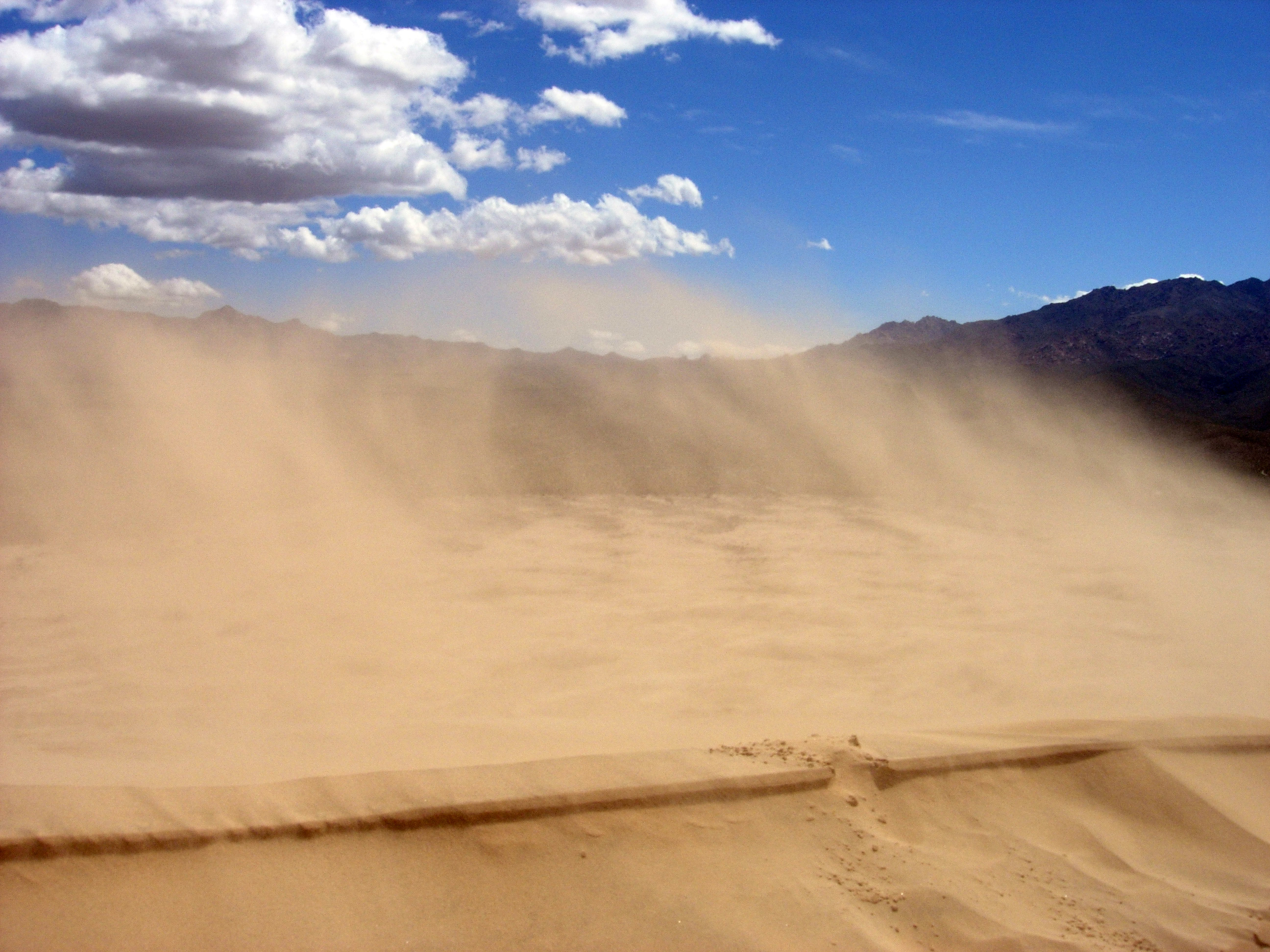
Sand blowing off a crest in the Kelso Dunes of the Mojave Desert, California

Aeolian or eolian (depending on the parsing of æ) is the term for sediment transport by wind. This process results in the formation of ripples and sand dunes. Typically, the size of the transported sediment is fine sand (<1 mm) and smaller, because air is a fluid with low density and viscosity, and can therefore not exert very much shear on its bed.

Bedforms are generated by aeolian sediment transport in the terrestrial near-surface environment. Ripples and dunes form as a natural self-organizing response to sediment transport.

Aeolian sediment transport is common on beaches and in the arid regions of the world, because it is in these environments that vegetation does not prevent the presence and motion of fields of sand.

Wind-blown very fine-grained dust is capable of entering the upper atmosphere and moving across the globe. Dust from the Sahara deposits on the Canary Islands and islands in the Caribbean, and dust from the Gobi Desert has deposited on the western United States. This sediment is important to the soil budget and ecology of several islands.

Deposits of fine-grained wind-blown glacial sediment are called loess.

=== Fluvial ===
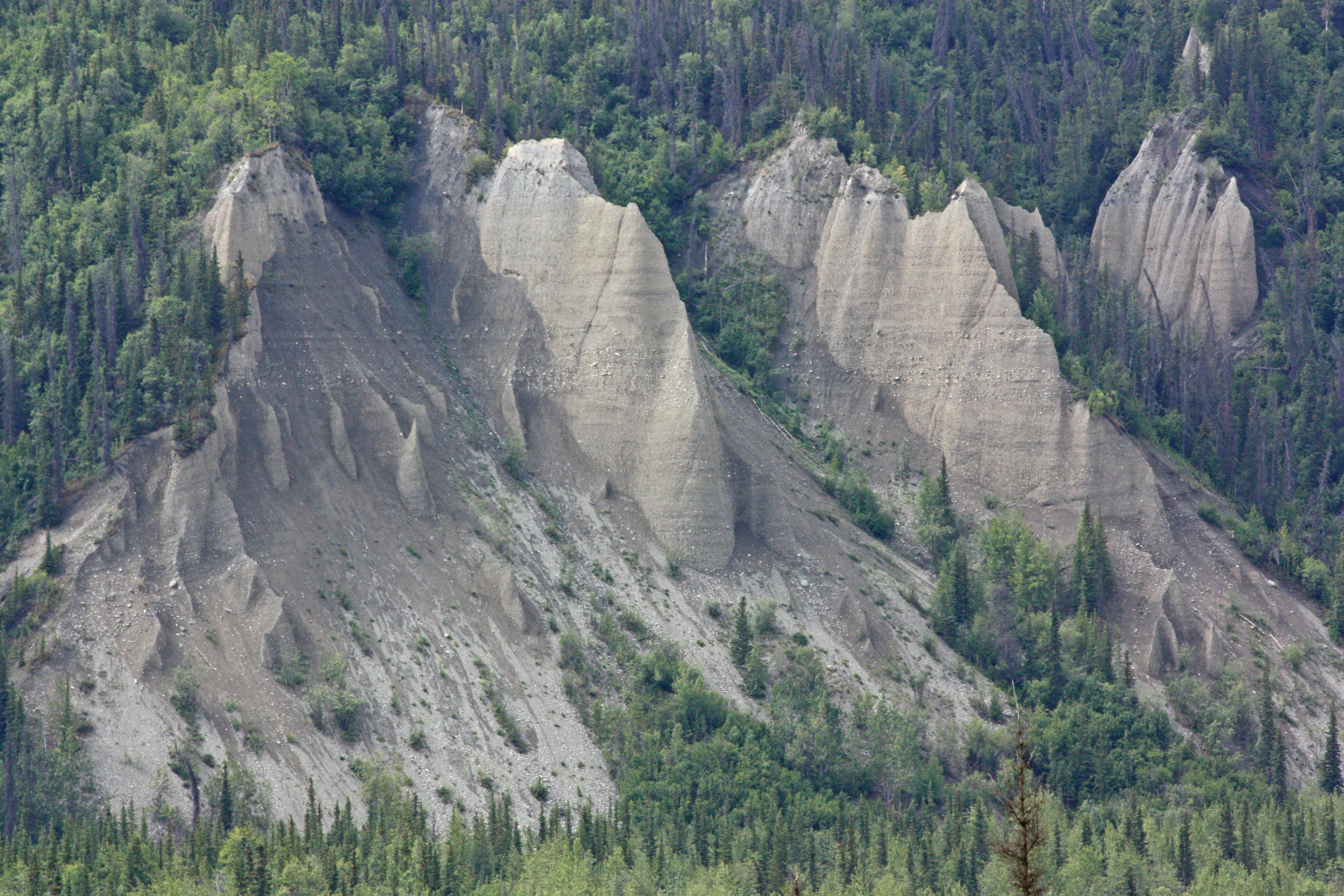
Deep, eroding glaciofluvial deposits alongside the Matanuska River, Alaska

In geography and geology, fluvial sediment processes or fluvial sediment transport are associated with rivers and streams and the deposits and landforms created by sediments. It can result in the formation of ripples and dunes, in fractal-shaped patterns of erosion, in complex patterns of natural river systems, and in the development of floodplains and the occurrence of flash floods. Sediment moved by water can be larger than sediment moved by air because water has both a higher density and viscosity. In typical rivers the largest carried sediment is of sand and gravel size, but larger floods can carry cobbles and even boulders. When the stream or rivers are associated with glaciers, ice sheets, or ice caps, the term glaciofluvial or fluvioglacial is used, as in periglacial flows and glacial lake outburst floods. Fluvial sediment processes include the motion of sediment and erosion or deposition on the river bed.

=== Coastal ===
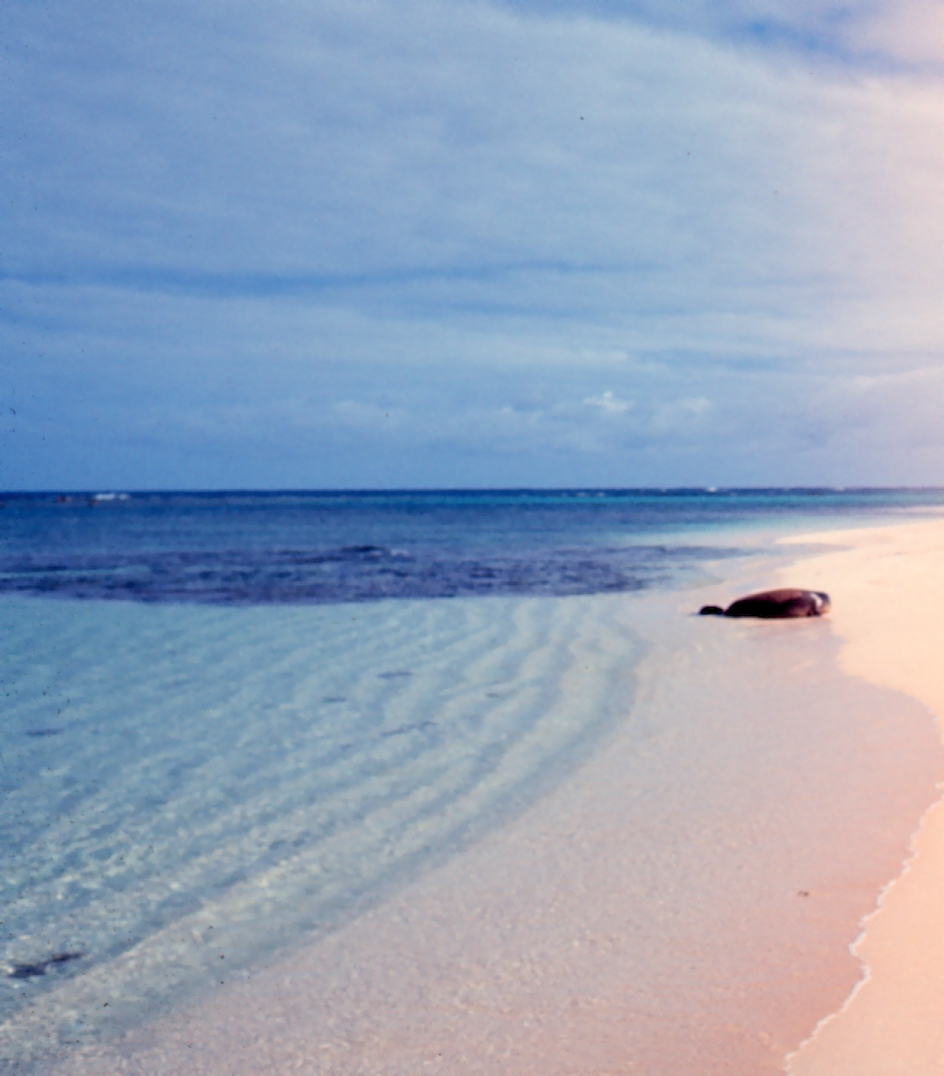
Sand ripples, Laysan Beach, Hawaii. Coastal sediment transport results in these evenly spaced ripples along the shore. Monk seal for scale.

Coastal sediment transport takes place in near-shore environments due to the motions of waves and currents. At the mouths of rivers, coastal sediment and fluvial sediment transport processes mesh to create river deltas.

Coastal sediment transport results in the formation of characteristic coastal landforms such as beaches, barrier islands, and capes.

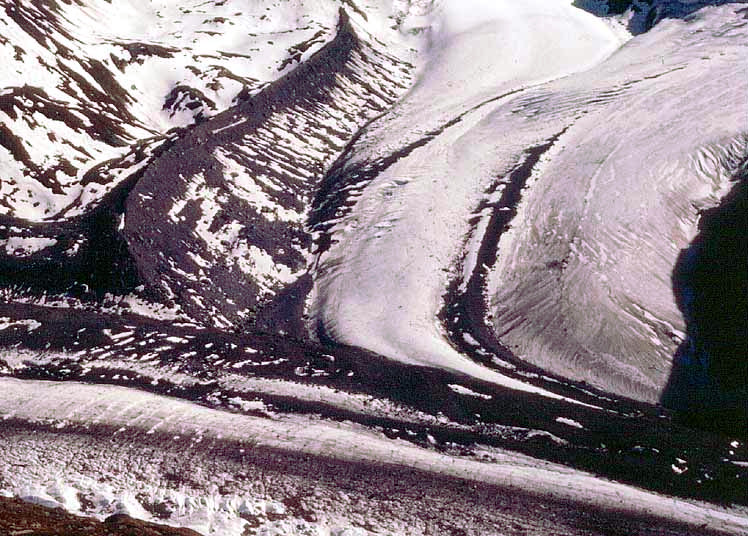
A glacier joining the Gorner Glacier, Zermatt, Switzerland. These glaciers transport sediment and leave behind lateral moraines.

=== Glacial ===
As glaciers move over their beds, they entrain and move material of all sizes. Glaciers can carry the largest sediment, and areas of glacial deposition often contain a large number of glacial erratics, many of which are several metres in diameter. Glaciers also pulverize rock into "glacial flour", which is so fine that it is often carried away by winds to create loess deposits thousands of kilometres afield. Sediment entrained in glaciers often moves approximately along the glacial flowlines, causing it to appear at the surface in the ablation zone.

=== Hillslope ===
In hillslope sediment transport, a variety of processes move regolith downslope. These include:

- Soil creep
- Tree throw
- Movement of soil by burrowing animals
- Slumping and landsliding of the hillslope

These processes generally combine to give the hillslope a profile that looks like a solution to the diffusion equation, where the diffusivity is a parameter that relates to the ease of sediment transport on the particular hillslope. For this reason, the tops of hills generally have a parabolic concave-up profile, which grades into a convex-up profile around valleys.

As hillslopes steepen, however, they become more prone to episodic landslides and other mass wasting events. Therefore, hillslope processes are better described by a nonlinear diffusion equation in which classic diffusion dominates for shallow slopes and erosion rates go to infinity as the hillslope reaches a critical angle of repose.

=== Debris flow ===
Large masses of material are moved in debris flows, hyperconcentrated mixtures of mud, clasts that range up to boulder-size, and water. Debris flows move as granular flows down steep mountain valleys and washes. Because they transport sediment as a granular mixture, their transport mechanisms and capacities scale differently from those of fluvial systems.

== Applications ==
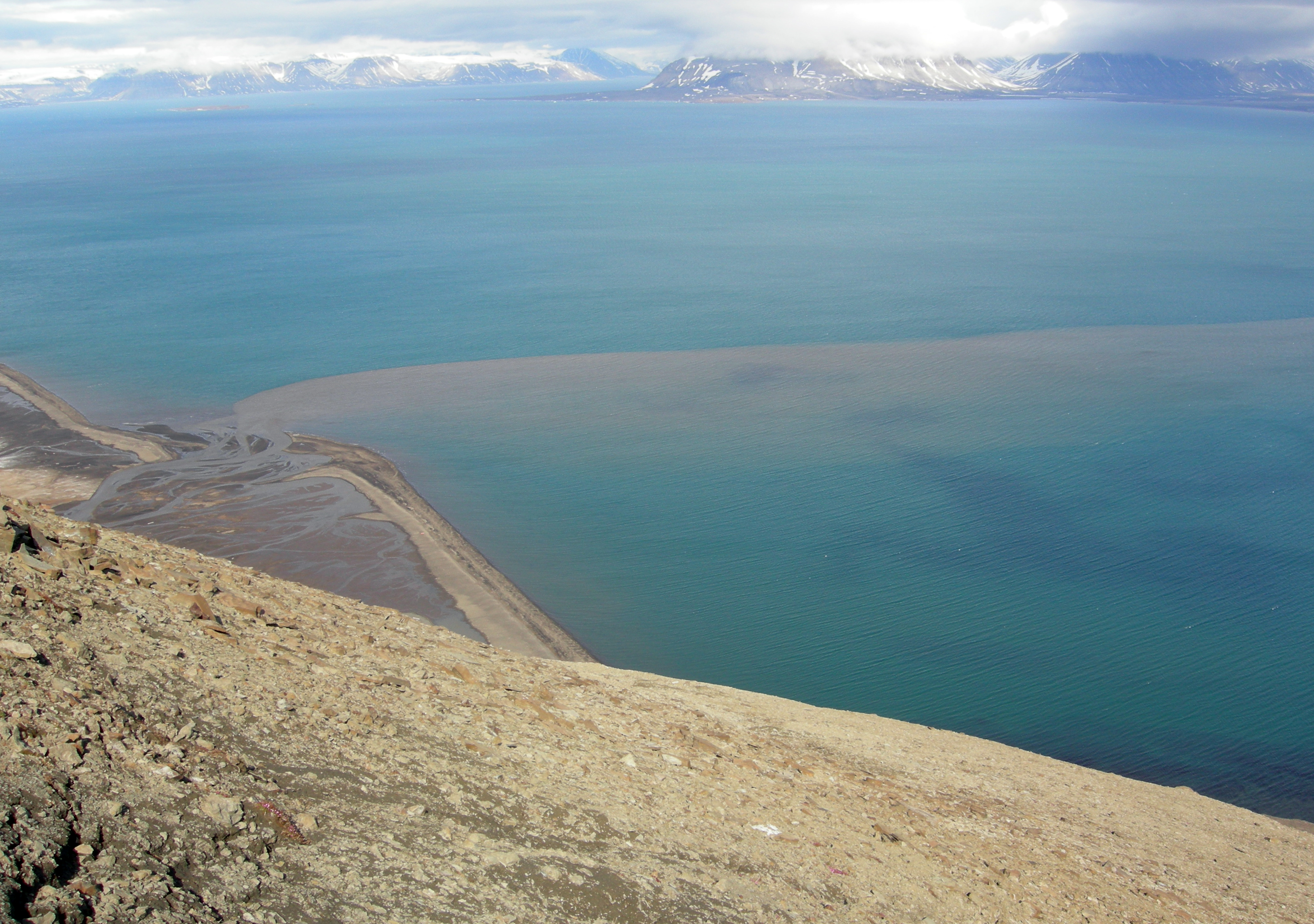
Suspended sediment from a stream emptying into a fjord (Isfjorden, Svalbard, Norway)

Sediment transport is applied to solve many environmental, geotechnical, and geological problems. Measuring or quantifying sediment transport or erosion is therefore important for coastal engineering. Several sediment erosion devices have been designed in order to quantify sediment erosion (e.g., Particle Erosion Simulator (PES)). One such device, also referred to as the BEAST (Benthic Environmental Assessment Sediment Tool) has been calibrated in order to quantify rates of sediment erosion.

Movement of sediment is important in providing habitat for fish and other organisms in rivers. Therefore, managers of highly regulated rivers, which are often sediment-starved due to dams, are often advised to stage short floods to refresh the bed material and rebuild bars. This is also important, for example, in the Grand Canyon of the Colorado River, to rebuild shoreline habitats also used as campsites.

Sediment discharge into a reservoir formed by a dam forms a reservoir delta. This delta will fill the basin, and eventually, either the reservoir will need to be dredged or the dam will need to be removed. Knowledge of sediment transport can be used to properly plan to extend the life of a dam.

Geologists can use inverse solutions of transport relationships to understand flow depth, velocity, and direction, from sedimentary rocks and young deposits of alluvial materials.

Flow in culverts, over dams, and around bridge piers can cause erosion of the bed. This erosion can damage the environment and expose or unsettle the foundations of the structure. Therefore, good knowledge of the mechanics of sediment transport in a built environment are important for civil and hydraulic engineers.

When suspended sediment transport is increased due to human activities, causing environmental problems including the filling of channels, it is called siltation after the grain-size fraction dominating the process.

== Initiation of motion ==
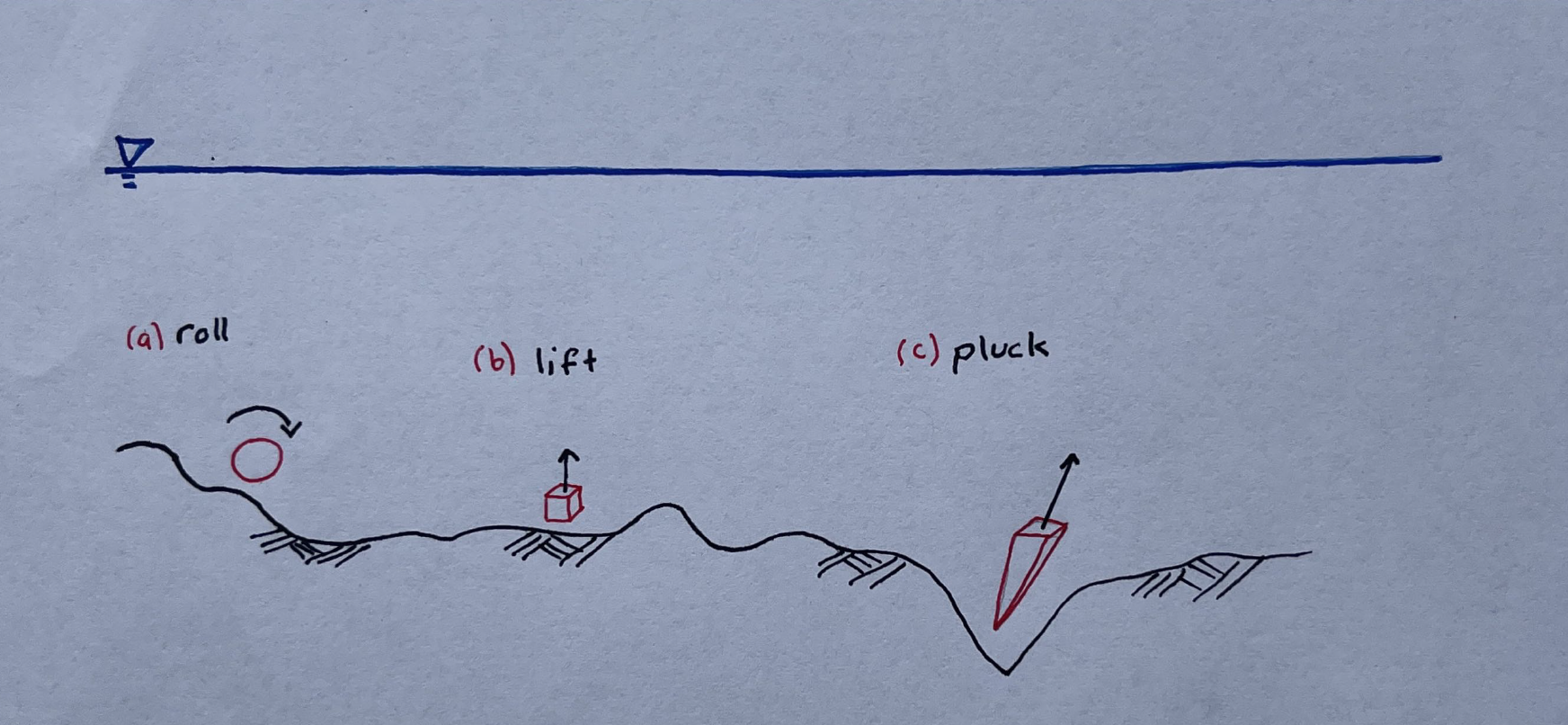
Mechanisms of movement in sediment transport. (a) Roll: sediment particle is rotated by shear stress along the ground (b) Lift: Sediment particle is lifted by the shear stress into the bulk (c) Pluck: Sediment particle is extracted from crevices in the ground by shear stress

=== Stress balance ===
For a fluid to begin transporting sediment that is currently at rest on a surface, the boundary (or bed) shear stress $\tau_b$ exerted by the fluid must exceed the critical shear stress $\tau_c$ for the initiation of motion of grains at the bed. This basic criterion for the initiation of motion can be written as:

$$\tau_b=\tau_c$$.

This is typically represented by a comparison between a dimensionless shear stress $\tau_b*$ and a dimensionless critical shear stress $\tau_c*$. The nondimensionalization is in order to compare the driving forces of particle motion (shear stress) to the resisting forces that would make it stationary (particle density and size). This dimensionless shear stress, $\tau*$, is called the Shields parameter and is defined as:

$$\tau*=\frac{\tau}{(\rho_s-\rho_f)(g)(D)}$$.

And the new equation to solve becomes:

$$\tau_b*=\tau_c*$$.

The equations included here describe sediment transport for clastic, or granular sediment. They do not work for clays and muds because these types of floccular sediments do not fit the geometric simplifications in these equations, and also interact thorough electrostatic forces. The equations were also designed for fluvial sediment transport of particles carried along in a liquid flow, such as that in a river, canal, or other open channel.

Only one size of particle is considered in this equation. However, river beds are often formed by a mixture of sediment of various sizes. In case of partial motion where only a part of the sediment mixture moves, the river bed becomes enriched in large gravel as the smaller sediments are washed away. The smaller sediments present under this layer of large gravel have a lower possibility of movement and total sediment transport decreases. This is called armouring effect. Other forms of armouring of sediment or decreasing rates of sediment erosion can be caused by carpets of microbial mats, under conditions of high organic loading.

=== Critical shear stress ===
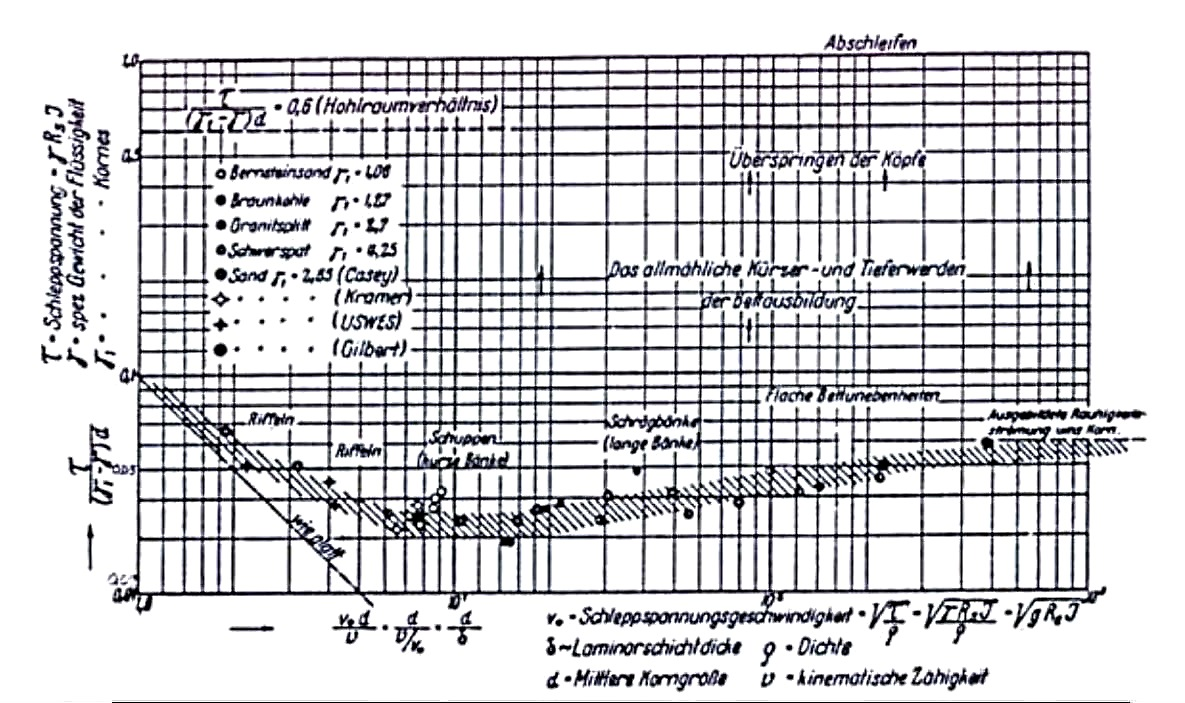
Original Shields diagram, 1936

The Shields diagram empirically shows how the dimensionless critical shear stress (i.e. the dimensionless shear stress required for the initiation of motion) is a function of a particular form of the particle Reynolds number, $\mathrm{Re}_p$ or Reynolds number related to the particle. This allows the criterion for the initiation of motion to be rewritten in terms of a solution for a specific version of the particle Reynolds number, called $\mathrm{Re}_p*$.

$$\tau_b*=f\left(\mathrm{Re}_p*\right)$$

This can then be solved by using the empirically derived Shields curve to find $\tau_c*$ as a function of a specific form of the particle Reynolds number called the boundary Reynolds number. The mathematical solution of the equation was given by Dey.

=== Particle Reynolds number ===
In general, a particle Reynolds number has the form:

$$\mathrm{Re}_p=\frac{U_p D}{\nu}$$

Where $U_p$ is a characteristic particle velocity, $D$ is the grain diameter (a characteristic particle size), and $\nu$ is the kinematic viscosity, which is given by the dynamic viscosity, $\mu$, divided by the fluid density, ${\rho_f}$.

$$\nu=\frac{\mu}{\rho_f}$$

The specific particle Reynolds number of interest is called the boundary Reynolds number, and it is formed by replacing the velocity term in the particle Reynolds number by the shear velocity, $u_*$, which is a way of rewriting shear stress in terms of velocity.

$$u_*=\sqrt{\frac{\tau_b}{\rho_f}}=\kappa z \frac{\partial u}{\partial z}$$

where $\tau_b$ is the bed shear stress (described below), and $\kappa$ is the von Kármán constant, where

$$\kappa = {0.407}$$.

The particle Reynolds number is therefore given by:

$$\mathrm{Re}_p*=\frac{u_* D}{\nu}$$

=== Bed shear stress ===
The boundary Reynolds number can be used with the Shields diagram to empirically solve the equation

$$\tau_c*=f\left(\mathrm{Re}_p*\right)$$,

which solves the right-hand side of the equation

$$\tau_b*=\tau_c*$$.

In order to solve the left-hand side, expanded as

$$\tau_b*=\frac{\tau_b}{(\rho_s-\rho_f)(g)(D)}$$,

the bed shear stress needs to be found, ${\tau_b}$. There are several ways to solve for the bed shear stress. The simplest approach is to assume the flow is steady and uniform, using the reach-averaged depth and slope. because it is difficult to measure shear stress in situ, this method is also one of the most-commonly used. The method is known as the depth-slope product.

==== Depth-slope product ====
For a river undergoing approximately steady, uniform equilibrium flow, of approximately constant depth h and slope angle θ over the reach of interest, and whose width is much greater than its depth, the bed shear stress is given by some momentum considerations stating that the gravity force component in the flow direction equals exactly the friction force. For a wide channel, it yields:

$$\tau_b=\rho g h \sin(\theta)$$

For shallow slope angles, which are found in almost all natural lowland streams, the small-angle formula shows that $\sin(\theta)$ is approximately equal to $\tan(\theta)$, which is given by $S$, the slope. Rewritten with this:

$$\tau_b=\rho g h S$$

==== Shear velocity, velocity, and friction factor ====
For the steady case, by extrapolating the depth-slope product and the equation for shear velocity:

$$\tau_b=\rho g h S$$

$$u_*=\sqrt{\left(\frac{\tau_b}{\rho}\right)}$$,

The depth-slope product can be rewritten as:

$$\tau_b=\rho u_*^2$$.

$u*$ is related to the mean flow velocity, $\bar{u}$, through the generalized Darcy–Weisbach friction factor, $C_f$, which is equal to the Darcy-Weisbach friction factor divided by 8 (for mathematical convenience). Inserting this friction factor,

$$\tau_b=\rho C_f \left(\bar{u} \right)^2$$.

==== Unsteady flow ====
For all flows that cannot be simplified as a single-slope infinite channel (as in the depth-slope product, above), the bed shear stress can be locally found by applying the Saint-Venant equations for continuity, which consider accelerations within the flow.

=== Example ===
==== Set-up ====
The criterion for the initiation of motion, established earlier, states that

$$\tau_b*=\tau_c*$$.

In this equation,

$\tau*=\frac{\tau}{(\rho_s-\rho)(g)(D)}$, and therefore

$$\frac{\tau_b}{(\rho_s-\rho)(g)(D)}=\frac{\tau_{c}}{(\rho_s-\rho)(g)(D)}$$.

$\tau_c*$ is a function of boundary Reynolds number, a specific type of particle Reynolds number.

$$\tau_c*=f \left(\mathrm{Re}_p* \right)$$.

For a particular particle Reynolds number, $\tau_c*$ will be an empirical constant given by the Shields Curve or by another set of empirical data (depending on whether or not the grain size is uniform).

Therefore, the final equation to solve is:

$$\frac{\tau_b}{(\rho_s-\rho)(g)(D)}=f \left(\mathrm{Re}_p* \right)$$.

==== Solution ====
Some assumptions allow the solution of the above equation.

The first assumption is that a good approximation of reach-averaged shear stress is given by the depth-slope product. The equation then can be rewritten as:

$${\rho g h S}=f\left(\mathrm{Re}_p* \right){(\rho_s-\rho)(g)(D)}$$.

Moving and re-combining the terms produces:

$${h S}={\frac{(\rho_s-\rho)}{\rho}(D)}\left(f \left(\mathrm{Re}_p* \right) \right)=R D \left(f \left(\mathrm{Re}_p* \right) \right)$$

where R is the submerged specific gravity of the sediment.

The second assumption is that the particle Reynolds number is high. This typically applies to particles of gravel-size or larger in a stream, and means the critical shear stress is constant. The Shields curve shows that for a bed with a uniform grain size,

$$\tau_c*=0.06$$.

Later researchers have shown this value is closer to

$$\tau_c*=0.03$$

for more uniformly sorted beds. Therefore the replacement

$$\tau_c*=f \left(\mathrm{Re}_p* \right)$$

is used to insert both values at the end.

The equation now reads:

$${h S}=R D \tau_c*$$

This final expression shows the product of the channel depth and slope is equal to the Shield's criterion times the submerged specific gravity of the particles times the particle diameter.

For a typical situation, such as quartz-rich sediment $\left(\rho_s=2650 \frac{kg}{m^3} \right)$ in water $\left(\rho=1000 \frac{kg}{m^3} \right)$, the submerged specific gravity is equal to 1.65.

$$R=\frac{(\rho_s-\rho)}{\rho}=1.65$$

Plugging this into the equation above,

$${h S}=1.65(D)\tau_c*$$.

For the Shield's criterion of $\tau_c*=0.06$. 0.06 * 1.65 = 0.099, which is well within standard margins of error of 0.1. Therefore, for a uniform bed,

$${h S}={0.1(D)}$$.

For these situations, the product of the depth and slope of the flow should be 10% of the diameter of the median grain diameter.

The mixed-grain-size bed value is $\tau_c*=0.03$, which is supported by more recent research as being more broadly applicable because most natural streams have mixed grain sizes. If this value is used, and D is changed to D_50 ("50" for the 50th percentile, or the median grain size, as an appropriate value for a mixed-grain-size bed), the equation becomes:

$${h S}={0.05(D_{50})}$$

Which means that the depth times the slope should be about 5% of the median grain diameter in the case of a mixed-grain-size bed.

== Modes of entrainment ==
The sediments entrained in a flow can be transported along the bed as bed load in the form of sliding and rolling grains, or in suspension as suspended load advected by the main flow. Some sediment materials may also come from the upstream reaches and be carried downstream in the form of wash load.

=== Rouse number ===
The location in the flow in which a particle is entrained is determined by the Rouse number, which is determined by the density ρ_{s} and diameter d of the sediment particle, and the density ρ and kinematic viscosity ν of the fluid, determine in which part of the flow the sediment particle will be carried.

$$P=\frac{w_s}{\kappa u_\ast}$$

Here, the Rouse number is given by P. The term in the numerator is the (downwards) sediment the sediment settling velocity w_{s}, which is discussed below. The upwards velocity on the grain is given as a product of the von Kármán constant, κ = 0.4, and the shear velocity, u_{∗}.

The following table gives the approximate required Rouse numbers for transport as bed load, suspended load, and wash load.

Mode of Transport	Rouse Number
Initiation of motion	>7.5
Bed load	>2.5, <7.5
Suspended load: 50% Suspended	>1.2, <2.5
Suspended load: 100% Suspended	>0.8, <1.2
Wash load	<0.8

=== Settling velocity ===
Streamlines around a sphere falling through a fluid. This illustration is accurate for laminar flow, in which the particle Reynolds number is small. This is typical for small particles falling through a viscous fluid; larger particles would result in the creation of a turbulent wake.

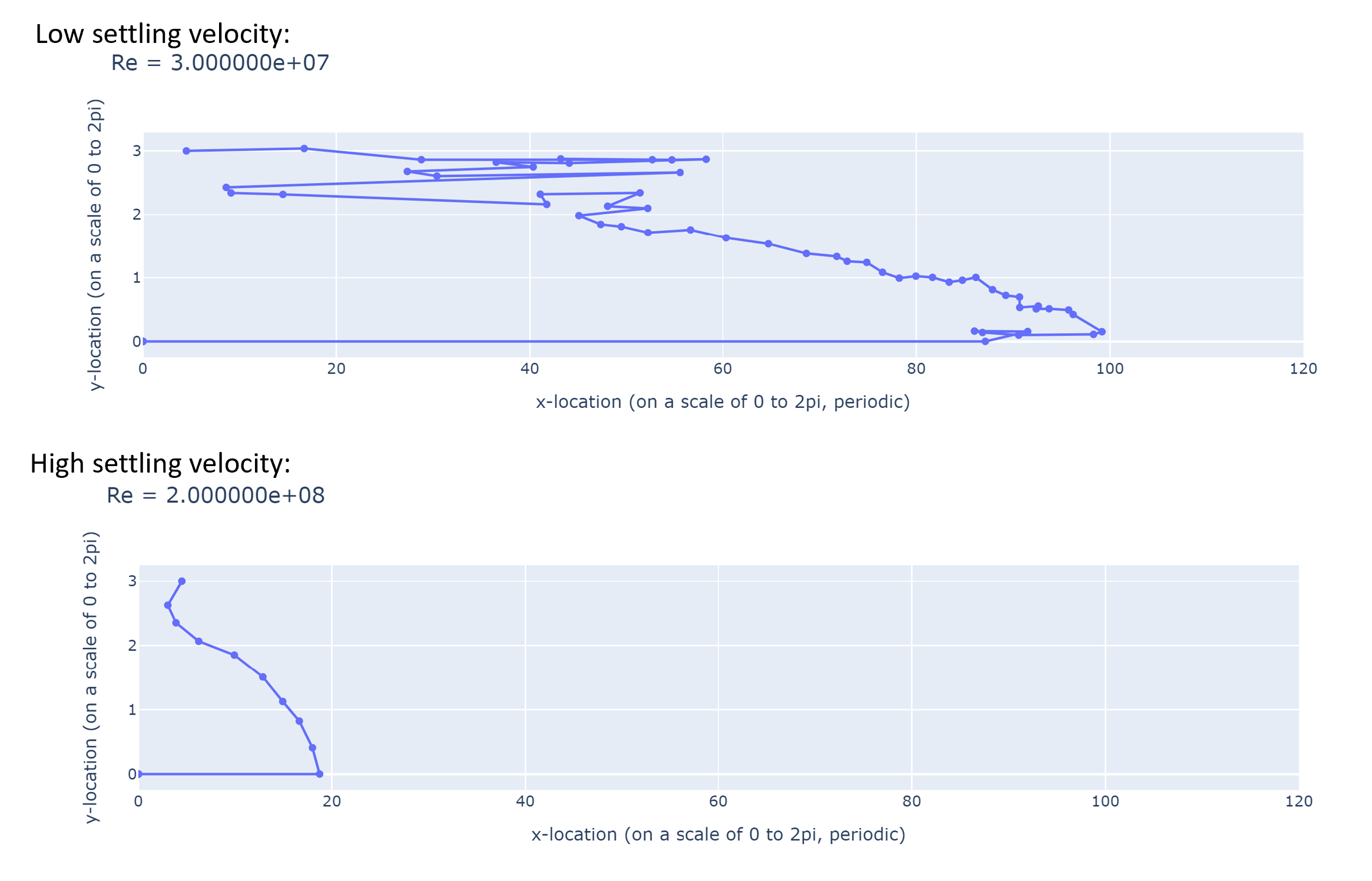
For particles with a small settling velocity, diffusion will increase the complexity of the particle's path to the bottom and the time it takes to settle compared to particles with high settling velocities.

The settling velocity (also called the "fall velocity" or "terminal velocity") is a function of the particle Reynolds number. Generally, for small particles (laminar approximation), it can be calculated with Stokes' Law. For larger particles (turbulent particle Reynolds numbers), fall velocity is calculated with the turbulent drag law. Dietrich (1982) compiled a large amount of published data to which he empirically fit settling velocity curves. Ferguson and Church (2006) analytically combined the expressions for Stokes flow and a turbulent drag law into a single equation that works for all sizes of sediment, and successfully tested it against the data of Dietrich. Their equation is

$$w_s=\frac{RgD^2}{C_1 \nu + (0.75 C_2 R g D^3)^{(0.5)}}$$.

In this equation w_{s} is the sediment settling velocity, g is acceleration due to gravity, and D is mean sediment diameter. $\nu$ is the kinematic viscosity of water, which is approximately 1.0 × 10^{−6} m^{2}/s for water at 20 °C.

$C_1$ and $C_2$ are constants related to the shape and smoothness of the grains.

Constant	Smooth Spheres	Natural Grains: Sieve Diameters	Natural Grains: Nominal Diameters	Limit for Ultra-Angular Grains
$C_1$	18	18	20	24
$C_2$	0.4	1.0	1.1	1.2

The expression for fall velocity can be simplified so that it can be solved only in terms of D. We use the sieve diameters for natural grains, $g=9.8$, and values given above for $\nu$ and $R$. From these parameters, the fall velocity is given by the expression:

$$w_s=\frac{16.17D^2}{1.8\cdot10^{-5} + (12.1275D^3)^{(0.5)}}$$

Alternatively, settling velocity for a particle of sediment can be derived using Stokes Law assuming quiescent (or still) fluid in steady state. The resulting formulation for settling velocity is,

${\displaystyle w_{s}={\frac {g~({\frac {\rho _{s}-\rho }{\rho }})~d_{sed}^{2}}{18\nu }}},$

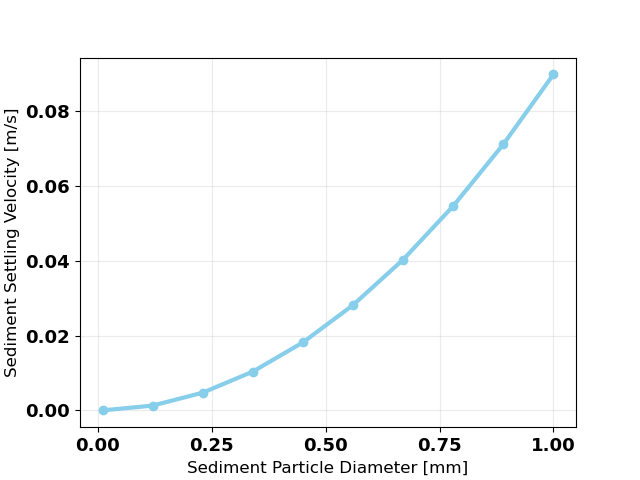
A plot showing the relationship between sediment particle diameter and the Stokes settling velocity

where $g$ is the gravitational constant; $\rho_s$ is the density of the sediment; $\rho$ is the density of water; $d_{sed}$ is the sediment particle diameter (commonly assumed to be the median particle diameter, often referred to as $d_{50}$ in field studies); and $\nu$ is the molecular viscosity of water. The Stokes settling velocity can be thought of as the terminal velocity resulting from balancing a particle's buoyant force (proportional to the cross-sectional area) with the gravitational force (proportional to the mass). Small particles will have a slower settling velocity than heavier particles, as seen in the figure. This has implications for many aspects of sediment transport, for example, how far downstream a particle might be advected in a river.

== Hjulström–Sundborg diagram ==
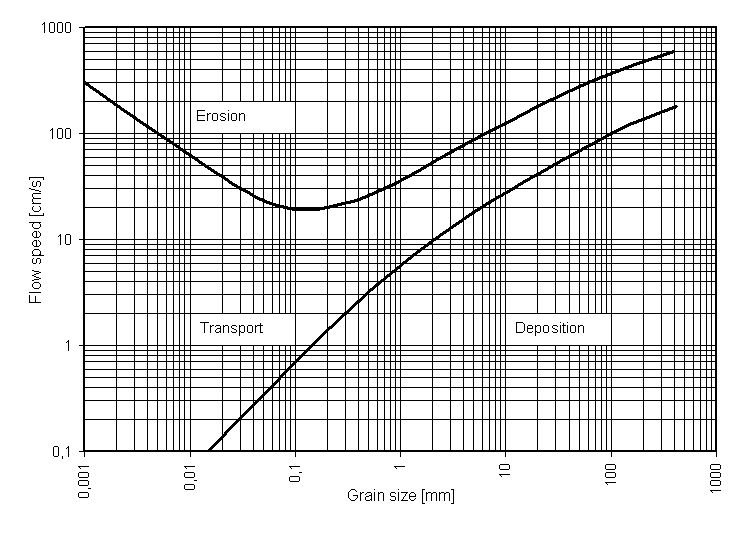
The logarithmic Hjulström curve

In 1935, Filip Hjulström created the Hjulström curve, a graph which shows the relationship between the size of sediment and the velocity required to erode (lift it), transport it, or deposit it. The graph is logarithmic.

Åke Sundborg later modified the Hjulström curve to show separate curves for the movement threshold corresponding to several water depths, as is necessary if the flow velocity rather than the boundary shear stress (as in the Shields diagram) is used for the flow strength.

This curve has no more than a historical value nowadays, although its simplicity is still attractive. Among the drawbacks of this curve are that it does not take the water depth into account and more importantly, that it does not show that sedimentation is caused by flow velocity deceleration and erosion is caused by flow acceleration. The dimensionless Shields diagram is now unanimously accepted for initiation of sediment motion in rivers.

== Transport rate ==
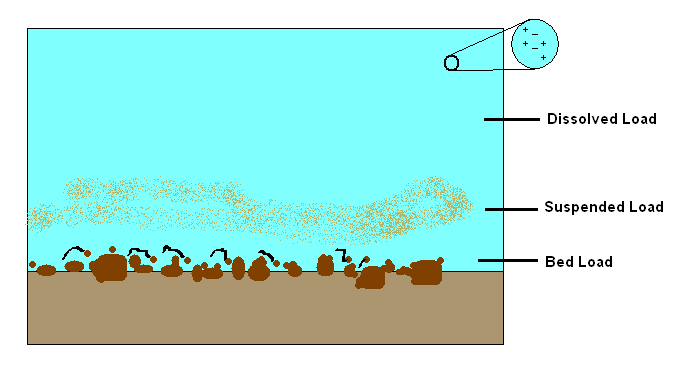
A schematic diagram of where the different types of sediment load are carried in the flow. Dissolved load is not sediment: it is composed of disassociated ions moving along with the flow. It may, however, constitute a significant proportion (often several percent, but occasionally greater than half) of the total amount of material being transported by the stream.

Formulas to calculate sediment transport rate exist for sediment moving in several different parts of the flow. These formulas are often segregated into bed load, suspended load, and wash load. They may sometimes also be segregated into bed material load and wash load.

=== Bed load ===
Bed load moves by rolling, sliding, and hopping (or saltating) over the bed, and moves at a small fraction of the fluid flow velocity. Bed load is generally thought to constitute 5–10% of the total sediment load in a stream, making it less important in terms of mass balance. However, the bed material load (the bed load plus the portion of the suspended load which comprises material derived from the bed) is often dominated by bed load, especially in gravel-bed rivers. This bed material load is the only part of the sediment load that actively interacts with the bed. As the bed load is an important component of that, it plays a major role in controlling the morphology of the channel.

Bed load transport rates are usually expressed as being related to excess dimensionless shear stress raised to some power. Excess dimensionless shear stress is a nondimensional measure of bed shear stress about the threshold for motion.

$$(\tau^*_b-\tau^*_c)$$,

Bed load transport rates may also be given by a ratio of bed shear stress to critical shear stress, which is equivalent in both the dimensional and nondimensional cases. This ratio is called the "transport stage" $(T_s \text{ or } \phi)$ and is an important in that it shows bed shear stress as a multiple of the value of the criterion for the initiation of motion.

$$T_s=\phi=\frac{\tau_b}{\tau_c}$$

When used for sediment transport formulae, this ratio is typically raised to a power.

The majority of the published relations for bedload transport are given in dry sediment weight per unit channel width, $b$ ("breadth"):

$$q_s=\frac{Q_s}{b}$$.

Due to the difficulty of estimating bed load transport rates, these equations are typically only suitable for the situations for which they were designed.

==== Notable bed load transport formulae ====
===== Meyer-Peter Müller and derivatives =====
The transport formula of Meyer-Peter and Müller, originally developed in 1948, was designed for well-sorted fine gravel at a transport stage of about 8. The formula uses the above nondimensionalization for shear stress,

$$\tau*=\frac{\tau}{(\rho_s-\rho)(g)(D)}$$,

and Hans Einstein's nondimensionalization for sediment volumetric discharge per unit width

$$q_s* = \frac{q_s}{D \sqrt{\frac{\rho_s-\rho}{\rho} g D}} = \frac{q_s}{Re_p \nu}$$.

Their formula reads:

$q_s* = 8\left(\tau*-\tau*_c \right)^{3/2}$.

Their experimentally determined value for $\tau*_c$ is 0.047, and is the third commonly used value for this (in addition to Parker's 0.03 and Shields' 0.06).

Because of its broad use, some revisions to the formula have taken place over the years that show that the coefficient on the left ("8" above) is a function of the transport stage:

$T_s \approx 2 \rightarrow q_s* = 5.7\left(\tau*-0.047 \right)^{3/2}$
$T_s \approx 100 \rightarrow q_s* = 12.1\left(\tau*-0.047 \right)^{3/2}$

The variations in the coefficient were later generalized as a function of dimensionless shear stress:

$$\begin{cases} q_s* = \alpha_s \left(\tau*-\tau_c* \right)^n \\ n = \frac{3}{2} \\ \alpha_s = 1.6 \ln\left(\tau*\right) + 9.8 \approx 9.64 \tau*^{0.166} \end{cases}$$

===== Wilcock and Crowe =====
In 2003, Peter Wilcock and Joanna Crowe (now Joanna Curran) published a sediment transport formula that works with multiple grain sizes across the sand and gravel range. Their formula works with surface grain size distributions, as opposed to older models which use subsurface grain size distributions (and thereby implicitly infer a surface grain sorting).

Their expression is more complicated than the basic sediment transport rules (such as that of Meyer-Peter and Müller) because it takes into account multiple grain sizes: this requires consideration of reference shear stresses for each grain size, the fraction of the total sediment supply that falls into each grain size class, and a "hiding function".

The "hiding function" takes into account the fact that, while small grains are inherently more mobile than large grains, on a mixed-grain-size bed, they may be trapped in deep pockets between large grains. Likewise, a large grain on a bed of small particles will be stuck in a much smaller pocket than if it were on a bed of grains of the same size. In gravel-bed rivers, this can cause "equal mobility", in which small grains can move just as easily as large ones. As sand is added to the system, it moves away from the "equal mobility" portion of the hiding function to one in which grain size again matters.

Their model is based on the transport stage, or ratio of bed shear stress to critical shear stress for the initiation of grain motion. Because their formula works with several grain sizes simultaneously, they define the critical shear stress for each grain size class, $\tau_{c,D_i}$, to be equal to a "reference shear stress", $\tau_{ri}$.

They express their equations in terms of a dimensionless transport parameter, $W_i^*$ (with the "$*$" indicating nondimensionality and the "$_i$" indicating that it is a function of grain size):

$$W_i^* = \frac{R g q_{bi}}{F_i u*^3}$$

$q_{bi}$ is the volumetric bed load transport rate of size class $i$ per unit channel width $b$. $F_i$ is the proportion of size class $i$ that is present on the bed.

They came up with two equations, depending on the transport stage, $\phi$. For $\phi < 1.35$:

$$W_i^* = 0.002 \phi^{7.5}$$

and for $\phi \geq 1.35$:

$$W_i^* = 14 \left(1 - \frac{0.894}{\phi^{0.5}}\right)^{4.5}$$.

This equation asymptotically reaches a constant value of $W_i^*$ as $\phi$ becomes large.

===== Wilcock and Kenworthy =====
In 2002, Peter Wilcock and T. A. Kenworthy, following Peter Wilcock (1998), published a sediment bed-load transport formula that works with only two sediments fractions, i.e. sand and gravel fractions. A mixed-sized sediment bed-load transport model using only two fractions offers practical advantages in terms of both computational and conceptual modeling by taking into account the nonlinear effects of sand presence in gravel beds on bed-load transport rate of both fractions. In fact, in the two-fraction bed load formula appears a new ingredient with respect to that of Meyer-Peter and Müller that is the proportion $F_i$ of fraction $i$ on the bed surface where the subscript $_i$ represents either the sand (s) or gravel (g) fraction. The proportion $F_i$, as a function of sand content $f_s$, physically represents the relative influence of the mechanisms controlling sand and gravel transport, associated with the change from a clast-supported to matrix-supported gravel bed. Moreover, since $f_s$ spans between 0 and 1, phenomena that vary with $f_s$ include the relative size effects producing "hiding" of fine grains and "exposure" of coarse grains. The "hiding" effect takes into account the fact that, while small grains are inherently more mobile than large grains, on a mixed-grain-size bed, they may be trapped in deep pockets between large grains. Likewise, a large grain on a bed of small particles will be stuck in a much smaller pocket than if it were on a bed of grains of the same size, which the Meyer-Peter and Müller formula refers to. In gravel-bed rivers, this can cause "equal mobility", in which small grains can move just as easily as large ones. As sand is added to the system, it moves away from the "equal mobility" portion of the hiding function to one in which grain size again matters.

Their model is based on the transport stage, i.e. $\phi$, or ratio of bed shear stress to critical shear stress for the initiation of grain motion. Because their formula works with only two fractions simultaneously, they define the critical shear stress for each of the two grain size classes, $\tau_{ri}$, where $_i$ represents either the sand (s) or gravel (g) fraction. The critical shear stress that represents the incipient motion for each of the two fractions is consistent with established values in the limit of pure sand and gravel beds and shows a sharp change with increasing sand content over the transition from a clast- to matrix-supported bed.

They express their equations in terms of a dimensionless transport parameter, $W_i^*$ (with the "$*$" indicating nondimensionality and the "$_i$" indicating that it is a function of grain size):

$$W_i^* = \frac{R g q_{bi}}{F_i u*^3}$$

$q_{bi}$ is the volumetric bed load transport rate of size class $i$ per unit channel width $b$. $F_i$ is the proportion of size class $i$ that is present on the bed.

They came up with two equations, depending on the transport stage, $\phi$. For $\phi < \phi^'$:

$$W_i^* = 0.002 \phi^{7.5}$$

and for $\phi \geq \phi^'$:

$$W_i^* = A \left(1 - \frac{\chi}{\phi^{0.5}}\right)^{4.5}$$.

This equation asymptotically reaches a constant value of $W_i^*$ as $\phi$ becomes large and the symbols $A,\phi^',\chi$ have the following values:

$$A = 70 ,\phi^'=1.19 ,\chi=0.908, \text{laboratory}$$
$$A = 115, \phi^'=1.27 ,\chi=0.923, \text{field}$$

In order to apply the above formulation, it is necessary to specify the characteristic grain sizes $D_s$ for the sand portion and $D_g$ for the gravel portion of the surface layer, the fractions $F_s$ and $F_g$ of sand and gravel, respectively in the surface layer, the submerged specific gravity of the sediment R and shear velocity associated with skin friction $u_*$ .

===== Kuhnle et al. =====
For the case in which sand fraction is transported by the current over and through an immobile gravel bed, Kuhnle et al.(2013), following the theoretical analysis done by Pellachini (2011), provides a new relationship for the bed load transport of the sand fraction when gravel particles remain at rest. It is worth mentioning that Kuhnle et al. (2013) applied the Wilcock and Kenworthy (2002) formula to their experimental data and found out that predicted bed load rates of sand fraction were about 10 times greater than measured and approached 1 as the sand elevation became near the top of the gravel layer. They, also, hypothesized that the mismatch between predicted and measured sand bed load rates is due to the fact that the bed shear stress used for the Wilcock and Kenworthy (2002) formula was larger than that available for transport within the gravel bed because of the sheltering effect of the gravel particles. To overcome this mismatch, following Pellachini (2011), they assumed that the variability of the bed shear stress available for the sand to be transported by the current would be some function of the so-called "Roughness Geometry Function" (RGF), which represents the gravel bed elevations distribution. Therefore, the sand bed load formula follows as:

$$q^*_s = 2.29*10^{-5} A(z_s)^{2.14}\left(\frac{\tau_b}{\tau_{cs} } \right)^{3.49}$$

where

$$q^*_s = \frac{q_s}{[(s-1)gD_s]^{0.5}\rho_sD_s}$$

the subscript $_s$ refers to the sand fraction, s represents the ratio $\rho_s/\rho_w$ where $\rho_s$ is the sand fraction density, $A(z_s)$ is the RGF as a function of the sand level $z_s$ within the gravel bed, $\tau_b$ is the bed shear stress available for sand transport and $\tau_{cs}$ is the critical shear stress for incipient motion of the sand fraction, which was calculated graphically using the updated Shields-type relation of Miller et al.(1977).

=== Suspended load ===
Suspended load is carried in the lower to middle parts of the flow, and moves at a large fraction of the mean flow velocity in the stream.

A common characterization of suspended sediment concentration in a flow is given by the Rouse Profile. This characterization works for the situation in which sediment concentration $c_0$ at one particular elevation above the bed $z_0$ can be quantified. It is given by the expression:

$$\frac{c_s}{c_0} = \left[\frac{z \left(h-z_0\right)}{z_0\left(h-z\right)}\right]^{-P/\alpha}$$

Here, $z$ is the elevation above the bed, $c_s$ is the concentration of suspended sediment at that elevation, $h$ is the flow depth, $P$ is the Rouse number, and $\alpha$ relates the eddy viscosity for momentum $K_m$ to the eddy diffusivity for sediment, which is approximately equal to one.

$$\alpha = \frac{K_s}{K_m} \approx 1$$

Experimental work has shown that $\alpha$ ranges from 0.93 to 1.10 for sands and silts.

The Rouse profile characterizes sediment concentrations because the Rouse number includes both turbulent mixing and settling under the weight of the particles. Turbulent mixing results in the net motion of particles from regions of high concentrations to low concentrations. Because particles settle downward, for all cases where the particles are not neutrally buoyant or sufficiently light that this settling velocity is negligible, there is a net negative concentration gradient as one goes upward in the flow. The Rouse Profile therefore gives the concentration profile that provides a balance between turbulent mixing (net upwards) of sediment and the downwards settling velocity of each particle.

=== Bed material load ===
Bed material load comprises the bed load and the portion of the suspended load that is sourced from the bed.

Three common bed material transport relations are the "Ackers-White", "Engelund-Hansen", "Yang" formulae. The first is for sand to granule-size gravel, and the second and third are for sand though Yang later expanded his formula to include fine gravel. That all of these formulae cover the sand-size range and two of them are exclusively for sand is that the sediment in sand-bed rivers is commonly moved simultaneously as bed and suspended load.

==== Engelund–Hansen ====
The bed material load formula of Engelund and Hansen is the only one to not include some kind of critical value for the initiation of sediment transport. It reads:

$$q_s* = \frac{0.05}{c_f} \tau*^{2.5}$$

where $q_s*$ is the Einstein nondimensionalization for sediment volumetric discharge per unit width, $c_f$ is a friction factor, and $\tau*$ is the Shields stress. The Engelund–Hansen formula is one of the few sediment transport formulae in which a threshold "critical shear stress" is absent.

=== Wash load ===
Wash load is carried within the water column as part of the flow, and therefore moves with the mean velocity of main stream. Wash load concentrations are approximately uniform in the water column. This is described by the endmember case in which the Rouse number is equal to 0 (i.e. the settling velocity is far less than the turbulent mixing velocity), which leads to a prediction of a perfectly uniform vertical concentration profile of material.

=== Total load ===
Some authors have attempted formulations for the total sediment load carried in water. These formulas are designed largely for sand, as (depending on flow conditions) sand often can be carried as both bed load and suspended load in the same stream or shoreface.

== Bed load sediment mitigation at intake structures ==
Riverside intake structures used in water supply, canal diversions, and water cooling can experience entrainment of bed load (sand-size) sediments. These entrained sediments produce multiple deleterious effects such as reduction or blockage of intake capacity, feedwater pump impeller damage or vibration, and result in sediment deposition in downstream pipelines and canals. Structures that modify local near-field secondary currents are useful to mitigate these effects and limit or prevent bed load sediment entry.

== See also ==
- Sedimentology – Study of natural sediments and their formation processes
- Exner equation – Law of sediment aggradation
- Hydrology – Science of the movement, distribution, and quality of water on Earth
- Sediment gravity flow – Sediment transport mechanism
- Stream capacity – Total amount of sediment a stream can transport
