= Rouse number =

Non-dimensional number in fluid dynamics

The Rouse number (P or Z) is a non-dimensional number in fluid dynamics which is used to define a concentration profile of suspended sediment and which also determines how sediment will be transported in a flowing fluid. It is a ratio between the sediment fall velocity $w_s$ and the upwards velocity on the grain as a product of the von Kármán constant $\kappa$ and the shear velocity $u_*$.

$$\mathrm{P} = \frac{w_s}{\kappa u_*}$$

Occasionally the factor β is included before the von Kármán constant in the equation, which is a constant which correlates eddy viscosity to eddy diffusivity. This is generally taken to be equal to 1, and therefore is ignored in actual calculation. However, it should not be ignored when considering the full equation.

$$\mathrm{P} = \frac{\beta w_s}{ \kappa u_*}$$

It is named after the American fluid dynamicist Hunter Rouse. It is a characteristic scale parameter in the Rouse Profile of suspended sediment concentration with depth in a flowing fluid. The concentration of suspended sediment with depth goes as the power of the negative Rouse number. It also is used to determine how the particles will move in the fluid. The required Rouse numbers for transport as bed load, suspended load, and wash load, are given below.

Mode of Transport	Rouse Number
Bed load	>2.5
Suspended load: 50% Suspended	>1.2, <2.5
Suspended load: 100% Suspended	>0.8, <1.2
Wash load	<0.8

== See also ==
- Sediment transport
- Sediment
- Dimensionless quantity
