= Depth–slope product =

River engineering formula

The depth–slope product is used to calculate the shear stress at the bed of an open channel containing fluid that is undergoing steady, uniform flow. It is widely used in river engineering, stream restoration, sedimentology, and fluvial geomorphology. It is the product of the water depth and the mean bed slope, along with the acceleration due to gravity and density of the fluid.

== Formulation ==
The use of the depth–slope product — in computing the bed shear-stress — specifically refers to two assumptions that are widely applicable to natural river channels: that the angle of the channel from horizontal is small enough that it can be approximated as the slope by the small-angle formula, and that the channel is much wider than it is deep, and sidewall effects can be ignored. Although it is a simplistic approach to find the shear stress in what can often be a locally unsteady fluvial system, when averaged over distances of kilometers, these local variations average and the depth–slope product becomes a useful tool to understand shear stress in open channels such as rivers.

=== Depth and hydraulic radius ===
The first assumption is that the channel is much wider than it is deep, and the equations can be solved as if the channel were infinitely wide. This means that side-wall effects can be ignored, and that the hydraulic radius, $R_h$, can be assumed to be equal to the channel depth, $h$.

$$R_h = \frac{A}{P}$$

where $A$ is the cross sectional area of flow and $P$ is wetted perimeter. For a semicircular channel, the hydraulic radius would simply be the true radius.

For an approximately rectangular channel (for simplicity in the mathematics of the explanation of the assumption),

$$A = b h$$,

where $b$ is the width (breadth) of the channel, and

$$P = b+2h$$.

For b>>h,

$$P \rightarrow b$$,

and therefore

$$R_h \rightarrow \frac{b h}{b} = h$$.

Formally, this assumption can generally be held when the width is greater than about 20 times the height; the exact amount of error accrued can be found by comparing the height to the hydraulic radius. For channels with a lower width-to-depth ratio, a better solution can be found by using the hydraulic radius instead of the above simplification.

=== Pressure ===
The total stress on the bed of an open channel of infinite width is given by the hydrostatic pressure acting on the bed. For a fluid of density $\rho$, an acceleration due to gravity $g$, and a flow depth $h$, the pressure exerted on the bed is simply the weight of an element of fluid, $\rho g$, times the depth of the flow, $h$. From this, we get the expression for the total pressure, $P_b$, acting on the bed.

$$P_b=\rho g h \,$$

=== Shear stress ===
In order to convert the pressure into a shear stress, it is necessary to determine the component of the pressure that provides shear on the bed. For a channel that is at an angle $\alpha$ from horizontal, the shear component of the stress acting on the bed $/\left(\tau_b\right)$, which is the component acting tangentially to the bed, equals the total pressure times the sine of the angle $\alpha$.

$$\tau_b=\rho g h \sin{\left(\alpha\right)} \,$$

In natural rivers, the angle $\alpha$ is typically very small. As a result, the small-angle formula states that:

$$\sin{\left(\alpha\right)}\approx\tan{\left(\alpha\right)}$$

The tangent of the angle $\alpha$ is, by definition, equal to the slope of the channel, $S$.

$$\tan{\left(\alpha\right)}\equiv S$$

From this, we can arrive at the final form of the relation between bed shear stress and depth–slope product:

$$\tau_b=\rho g h S \,$$

=== Scaling ===
Assuming a single, well-mixed, homogeneous fluid and a single acceleration due to gravity (both are good assumptions in natural rivers, and the second is a good assumption for processes on Earth, or any planetary body with a dominant influence on the local gravitational field), the only two variables that determine the boundary shear stress are the depth and the slope. This is the significance of the name of the formula.

$$\tau_b\propto h S$$

For natural streams, in the mks or SI system (units of pascals for shear stress), a typical useful relationship to remember is that:

$$\tau_b=10000 \left[\frac{\mathrm{kg}}{\mathrm{m}^2 \ \mathrm{s}^2}\right] h S$$

for water with a density of 1000 kg/m^{3} and approximating the acceleration due to gravity as 10 m/s^{2} (the error in this assumption is typically much smaller than the error from measurements).

== Uses ==
Bed shear stress can be used to find:

- The vertical velocity profile within the fluid flow
- The ability of the fluid to carry sediment
- The rate of shear dispersion of contaminants and tracers.

== See also ==
- Sediment
- Fluid mechanics
