= Suspended load =

Portion of sediment uplifted by a fluid's flow

The suspended load of a flow of fluid, such as a river, is the portion of its sediment uplifted by the fluid's flow in the process of sediment transportation. It is kept suspended by the fluid's turbulence. The suspended load generally consists of smaller particles, like clay, silt, and fine sands.

== Sediment transportation ==
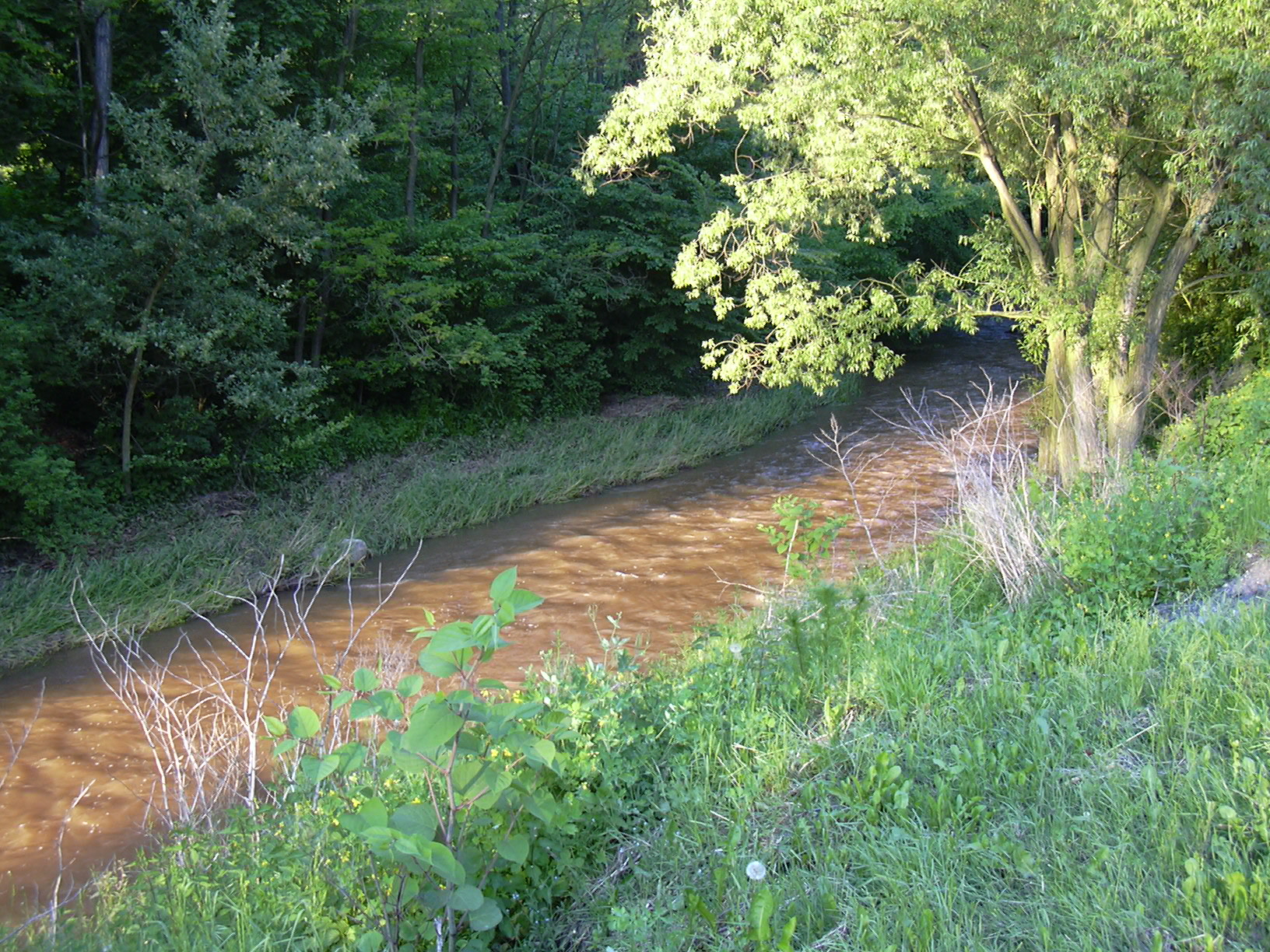
Sediment Transportation

The suspended load is one of the three layers of the fluvial sediment transportation system. The bed load consists of the larger sediment which is transported by saltation, rolling, and dragging on the riverbed. The suspended load is the middle layer that consists of the smaller sediment that's suspended. The wash load is uppermost layer which consist of the smallest sediment that can be seen with the naked eye; however, the wash load gets easily mixed with suspended load during transportation due to the very similar process. The wash load never touches the bed even outside of a current.

== Composition ==
The boundary between bed load and suspended load is not straightforward because whether a particle is in suspension or not depends on the flow velocity – it is easy to imagine a particle moving between bed load, part-suspension and full suspension in a fluid with variable flow. Suspended load generally consists of fine sand, silt and clay size particles although larger particles (coarser sands) may be carried in the lower water column in more intense flows.

== Suspended load vs suspended sediment ==
Suspended load and suspended sediment are very similar, but are not the same. Suspended Sediment contains sediment uplifted in Fluvial zones, but unlike suspended load no turbulence is required to keep it uplifted. Suspended loads required the Velocity to keep the sediment transporting above the bed. With low velocity the sediment will deposit.

== Velocity ==
The suspended load is carried within the lower to middle part of the water column and moves at a large fraction of the mean flow velocity of the stream, with a Rouse number between 0.8 and 1.2. The rates within the Rouse number reveal how at which the sediment will transport at the current velocity. It is the ratio of the fall velocity and uplift velocity on a grain.

Mode of Transport	Rouse Number
Bed Load	>2.5
Suspended Load 50%	>1.2, <2.5
Suspended Load 100%	>0.8, <1.2
Wash Load	<0.8

== Diagrams ==
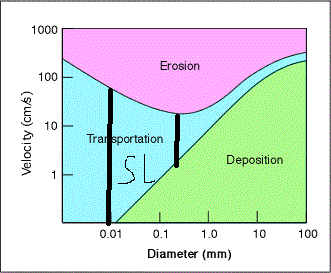
Hjulström diagram

Suspended load is often visualised using two diagrams. The Hjulström curve uses velocity and sediment size to compare the rate of erosion, transportation, and deposition. While the diagram shows the rate, one flaw about the Hjulström Diagram is that it doesn't show the depth of the creek giving an estimated rate.

The second diagram used is the Shields Diagram. The Shields Diagram (based on the Shields formula) uses the critical shear stress and Reynolds number to estimate transportation rate. The Shields Diagram is considered a more precise chart to estimate suspended load.

== Measuring suspended load ==
=== Shear stress ===
To find the stream power for sediment transportation, shear stress helps determine the force required to allow sediment transportation.

$\tau= Pw.g.d.s$

=== Critical shear stress ===
The point at which the sediment is transported within a stream

$\tau {\scriptstyle\text{c}}= \tau{\scriptstyle\text{c}} . g. (p{\scriptstyle\text{s}}-p{\scriptstyle\text{w}})d50$

=== Suspended load transport rate ===
$q{\scriptstyle\text{s}}=w.h.c{\scriptstyle\text{a}} .[((a/h)^z-(a/h))/((1-a/h)Z . (1.2-Z)) ]$

== See also ==
- Sediment
- Sediment transport
- Rouse number
- Bed load
- Wash load
- Dissolved load
