= Wash load =

Sedimentary process of rivers

Wash load is similar to a suspended load, but wash load sediment never interacts with the bed load. All of the sediment in the wash load stays suspended in the water throughout the channel (this concept has been debated). Wash load refers to a river's ability to move sediment through a channel.

Hans Albert Einstein described wash load as "if the sediment is added to the upstream end of a concrete channel and the channel is swept clean, and the sediment has not left any trace in the channel".

The sediments in the wash load are generally smaller than .0625 mm. What determines the wash load is the relationship between the size of the bed load and the size of the particles that never settle in the "fine sediment load" or wash load.

== Composition ==
Composition is a good way to classify the difference between wash and bed loads because the definition is distinct. The wash load is almost entirely made up of grains that are not found in quantity in the bed. Wash load grains tend to be very small (mostly clay and silts, but also some fine sands) and therefore have a small settling velocity, being kept in suspension by the flow turbulence.

The composition of the wash load changes as the bed load changes. According to Einstein, all particles that are not significantly represented in the deposits of the bed "must be" considered wash load. This means that as the bed load moves down the river and the size of the bed load is reduced so is the size of the wash load. This is shown by Einstein's "suggestion that the largest sediment size may be arbitrarily chosen as the grain diameter of the D_{10} (wash load) of which 10% of the bed sediment is finer.” Wash load also has a different composition than the bed load. The bed loads parent material is from directly around the water feature, but the wash loads source of sediment is defined as "sediment in transport that is derived from sources other than the bed."

== Sediment motion ==
Sediment motion is one way of classifying part of either the bed or wash load. Wash load particles do not experience the motions that are typical of the bed load because they are suspended in water.

"Bed load is made up of particles that are rolling, sliding or saltating and which are, therefore, in either continuous or intermittent contact with the bed. Suspended sediment moves in the water column above the bed and is rarely in contact with the bed".

== Velocity ==
Wash load is carried within the water column as part of the flow, and therefore moves with the mean flow velocity of mainstream. Because there is little or no interaction with the bed, the particles extract only negligible momentum from the flow.

== Sampling techniques ==
Lowering and raising a "nozzle" sampler through the water column collects wash load or sediment load data. This technique fails to sample the sediment load that is close to the bed, but sediment load close to the bed can be estimated with the Einstein-Brown transport formula. There is also another device the Helley-Smith sampler used by the United States Geological Survey, which can sample the unmeasured sediment load close to the bed. There are also equations that can be used to estimate wash load.
