= Bed load =

Particles in a flowing fluid that are transported along the bed

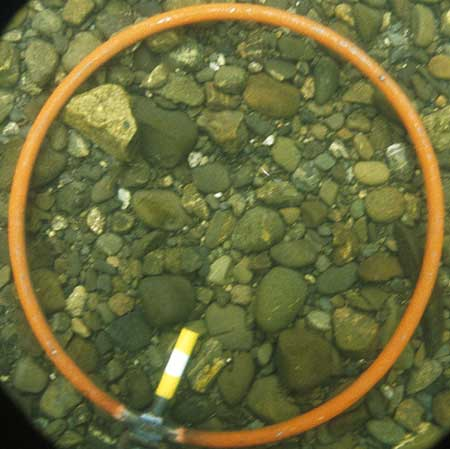
Bed load sediment in the thalweg of Campbell Creek in Alaska.

The term bed load or bedload describes particles in a flowing fluid (usually water) that are transported along the stream bed. Bed load is complementary to suspended load and wash load.

Bed load moves by rolling, sliding, and/or saltating (hopping).

Generally, bed load downstream will be smaller and more rounded than bed load upstream (a process known as downstream fining). This is due in part to attrition and abrasion which results from the stones colliding with each other and against the river channel, thus removing the rough texture (rounding) and reducing the size of the particles. However, selective transport of sediments also plays a role in relation to downstream fining: smaller-than average particles are more easily entrained than larger-than average particles, since the shear stress required to entrain a grain is linearly proportional to the diameter of the grain. However, the degree of size selectivity is restricted by the hiding effect described by Parker and Klingeman (1982), wherein larger particles protrude from the bed whereas small particles are shielded and hidden by larger particles, with the result that nearly all grain sizes become entrained at nearly the same shear stress.

Experimental observations suggest that a uniform free-surface flow over a cohesion-less plane bed is unable to entrain sediments below a critical value $\tau_{*c}$ of the ratio between measures of hydrodynamic (destabilizing) and gravitational (stabilizing) forces acting on sediment particles, the so-called Shields stress $\tau_*$. This quantity reads as:

$$\tau_*=\frac{u^2_*}{(s-1)gd}$$,

where $u_{*}$ is the friction velocity, s is the relative particle density, d is an effective particle diameter which is entrained by the flow, and g is gravity. Meyer-Peter-Müller formula for the bed load capacity under equilibrium and uniform flow conditions states that the magnitude of the bed load flux $q_s$ for unit width is proportional to the excess of shear stress with respect to a critical one $\tau_{*c}$. Specifically, $q_s$ is a monotonically increasing nonlinear function of the excess Shields stress $\phi(\tau_{*} -\tau_{*c} )$, typically expressed in the form of a power law.
