= List of people from Genoa =

This is a list of people from Genoa, Italy. Genoa is the capital of the Italian region of Liguria and the sixth-largest city in Italy. In 2015, 594,733 people lived within the city's administrative limits. As of the 2011 Italian census, the Province of Genoa, which in 2015 became the Metropolitan City of Genoa, counted 855,834 resident persons. Over 1.5 million people live in the wider metropolitan area stretching along the Italian Riviera.

== Artists ==
=== Architects ===
- Leon Battista Alberti, architect, humanist author, and polymath
- Carlo Barabino, architect
- Lorenzo Mongiardino, architect, interior designer
- Renzo Piano, architect
- Renzo Picasso, architect and urban planner

=== Musicians ===
- Carlo Abbate, music theorist and composer
- Pippo Barzizza, composer, arranger, conductor and music director
- Umberto Bindi, singer-songwriter
- Angelo Branduardi, folk singer, moved to Genoa at a young age
- Andrea Emanuele Brasi, known as Bresh, singer-songwriter and rapper
- Bonifaci Calvo, Genoese troubadour
- Lanfranc Cigala, Genoese troubadour, man of letters
- Fabrizio De André, singer-songwriter
- Perceval Doria, Genoese troubadour
- Simon Doria, Genoese troubadour
- Ivano Fossati, singer-songwriter
- Dany Franchi, blues guitarist, singer-songwriter
- Beppe Gambetta, guitarist, singer-songwriter
- Luchetto Gattilusio, Genoese troubadour
- Sandro Giacobbe, singer-songwriter
- Jacme Grils, Genoese troubadour
- Luca Grimaldi, Genoese troubadour
- Angelo Francesco Lavagnino, composer
- Matia Bazar, musical group
- Mario Molinari, known as Tedua, singer-songwriter and rapper
- Simone Molinaro, composer
- Federico Olivieri, known as Olly, singer-songwriter
- Natalino Otto, singer
- Niccolò Paganini, violinist and musical genius
- Calega Panzan, Genoese troubadour
- Gino Paoli, singer-songwriter, moved to Genoa at a young age
- Gian Franco Reverberi, composer and musician
- Gian Piero Reverberi, pianist, composer, arranger, conductor and entrepreneur
- Ricchi e Poveri, musical group
- Luigi Tenco, singer-songwriter, moved to Genoa at a young age
- Adam Sayf Viacava, known as Sayf, rapper and singer-songwriter

=== Painters ===
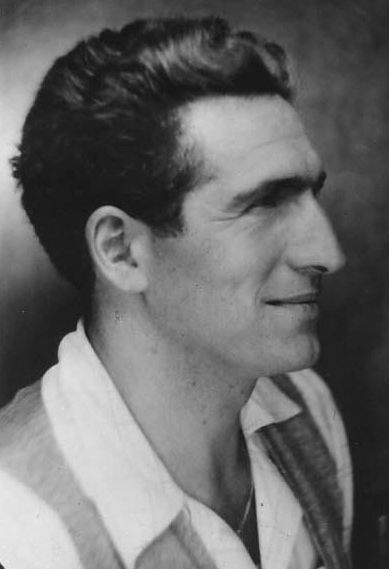
Enrico Accatino

- Enrico Accatino, painter, sculptor, designer
- Luca Cambiaso, painter
- Fra Simone da Carnuli, painter
- Valerio Castello, painter
- Giovanni Benedetto Castiglione, painter
- Edoardo Chiossone, engraver and painter
- Giuseppe Fraschieri, painter
- Giovanni Battista Gaulli, painter
- James Charles Harris, painter
- Alessandro Magnasco, painter
- Giovanni Stefano Maia, painter
- Domenico Piola, painter
- Ernesto Rayper, painter and engraver
- Emilio Scanavino, painter
- Bernardo Strozzi, painter

=== Sculptors ===
- Anton Maria Maragliano, sculptor
- Filippo Parodi, sculptor
- Giovanni Battista Tassara, sculptor

=== Writers ===
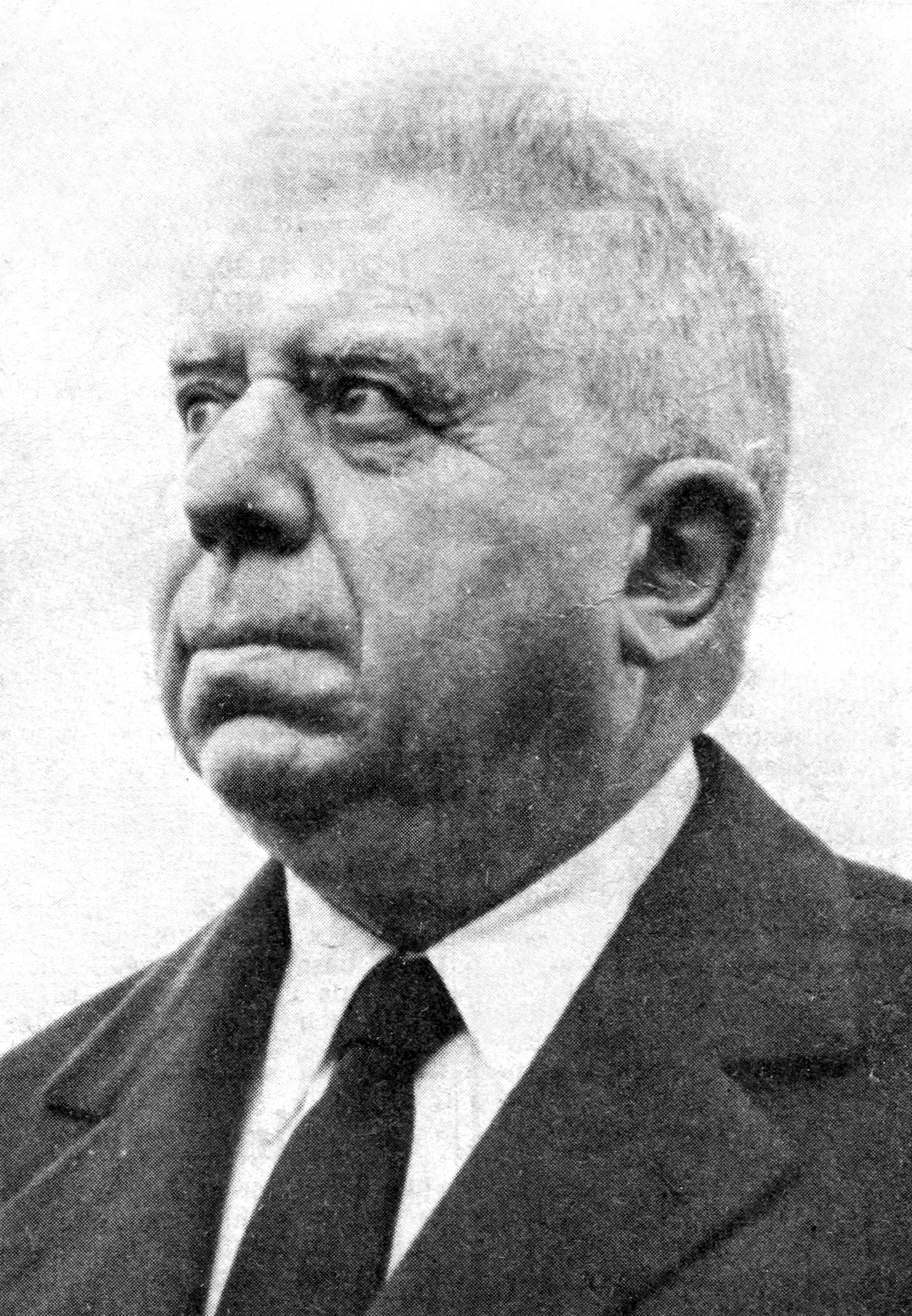
Eugenio Montale

- Dino Campana, poet, Genoa is a recurring theme of the Dino Campana's poetry
- Giorgio Caproni, poet, moved to Genoa at a young age
- Piero Jahier, poet, translator, journalist
- Eugenio Montale, poet, Nobel Prize winner
- Fernanda Pivano, writer, translator and critic
- Felice Romani, poet, wrote many librettos for the Opera
- Edoardo Sanguineti, poet

=== Other ===
- Giovan Battista Carpi, comics artist
- Felice delle Piane, art historian
- Alberto Terrile, photographer
- Antoinette Van Leer Polk, Baroness
- Girolamo Vassallo, engraver and coin-maker

== Business ==
- Enrico Piaggio, industrialist
- Paolo Ardoino, CEO of Tether

== Entertainment ==
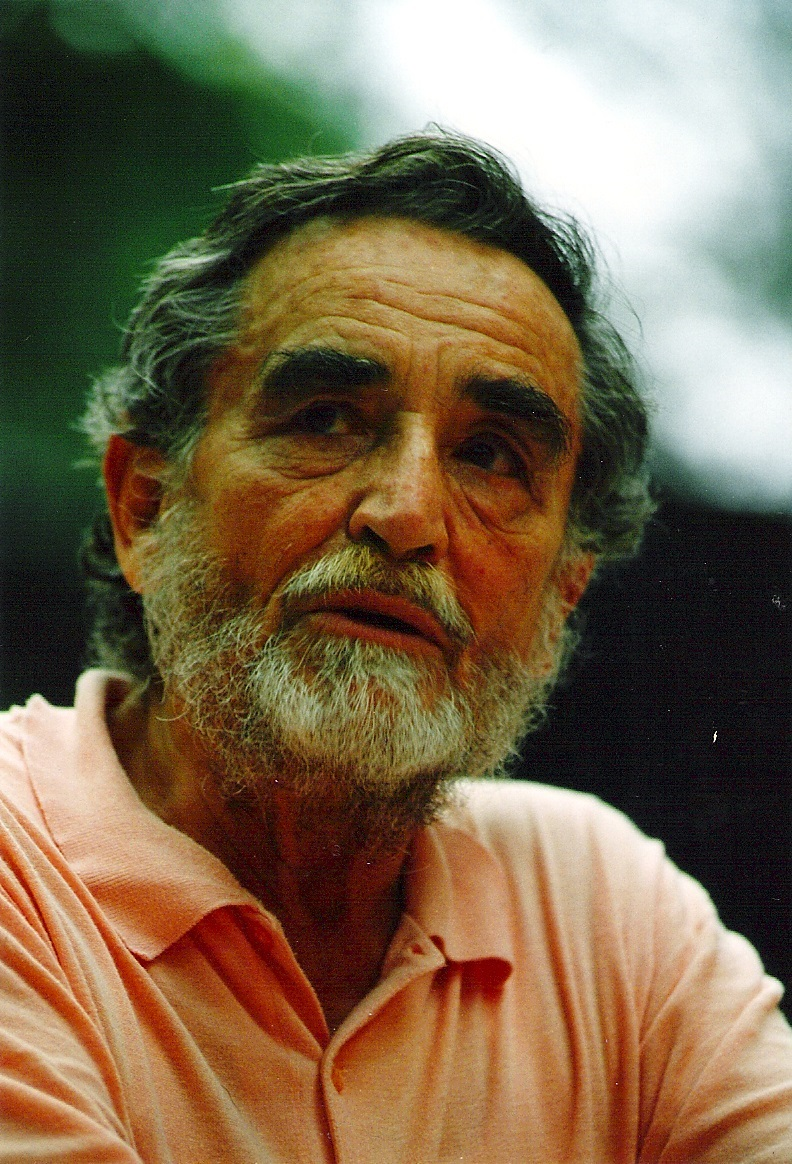
Vittorio Gassman

=== Actors ===
- George Eastman, actor
- Vittorio Gassman, actor
- Gilberto Govi, actor
- Beppe Grillo, actor, political activist
- Liliana Ross, Italian-born Chilean actress (La Colorina, Machos)
- Paolo Villaggio, actor

=== Film production ===
- Pietro Germi, film director
- Emanuele Luzzati, production designer, illustrator
- Enrico Casarosa, storyboard artist, film director

== Explorers ==
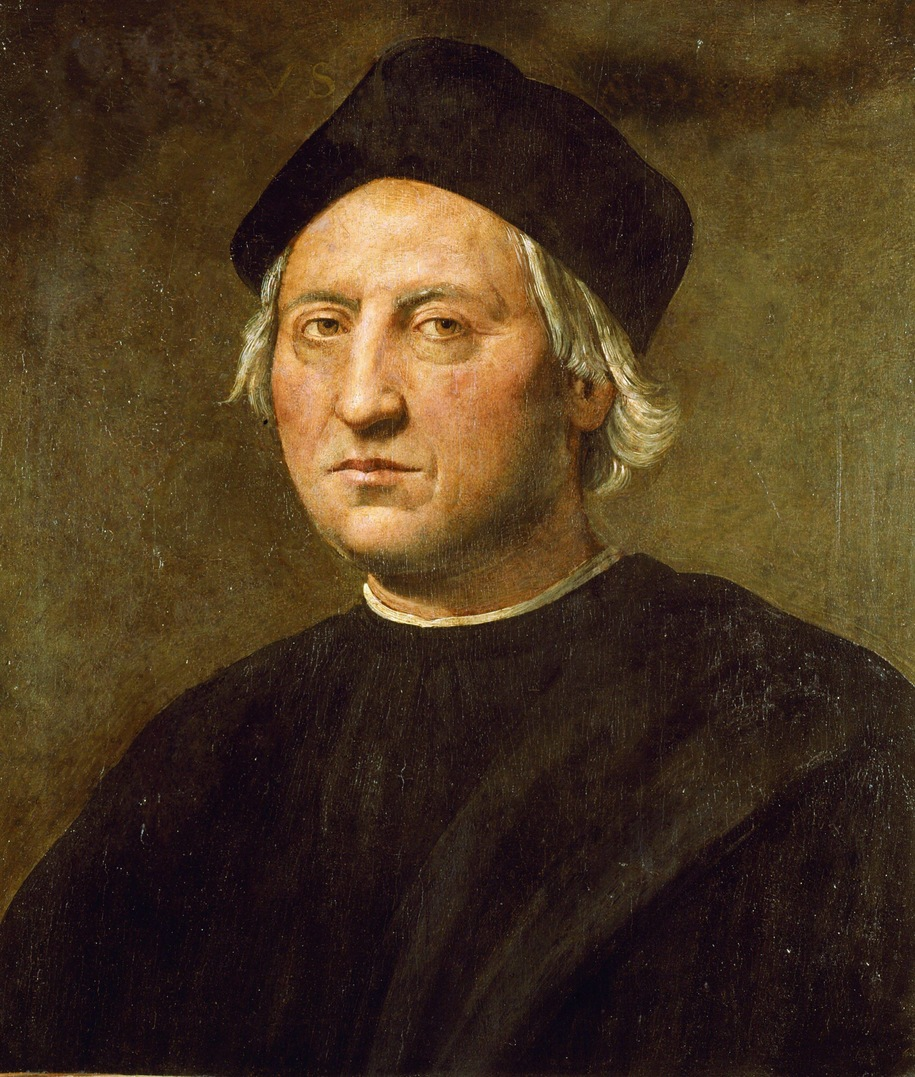
Christopher Columbus

- Enrico Alberto d'Albertis, explorer and naturalist
- Luigi D'Albertis, explorer and naturalist
- John Cabot, Genoese explorer and navigator
- Christopher Columbus, explorer and navigator
- Giacomo Doria, explorer, naturalist, botanist
- Henry, Count of Malta, Genoese adventurer
- Lancelotto Malocello, explorer and navigator
- António de Noli, explorer and navigator
- Antoniotto Usodimare, Genoese explorer
- Vandino and Ugolino Vivaldi, Genoese explorers and merchants

== Families and noble houses ==
- Adorno family
- Cavanna family
- Cybo family
- Delle Piane family
- Doria family
- Durazzo family
- Fieschi family
- Gattilusi family
- Ghisolfi family
- House of Grimaldi
- Imperiali family
- House of Spinola

== Military ==
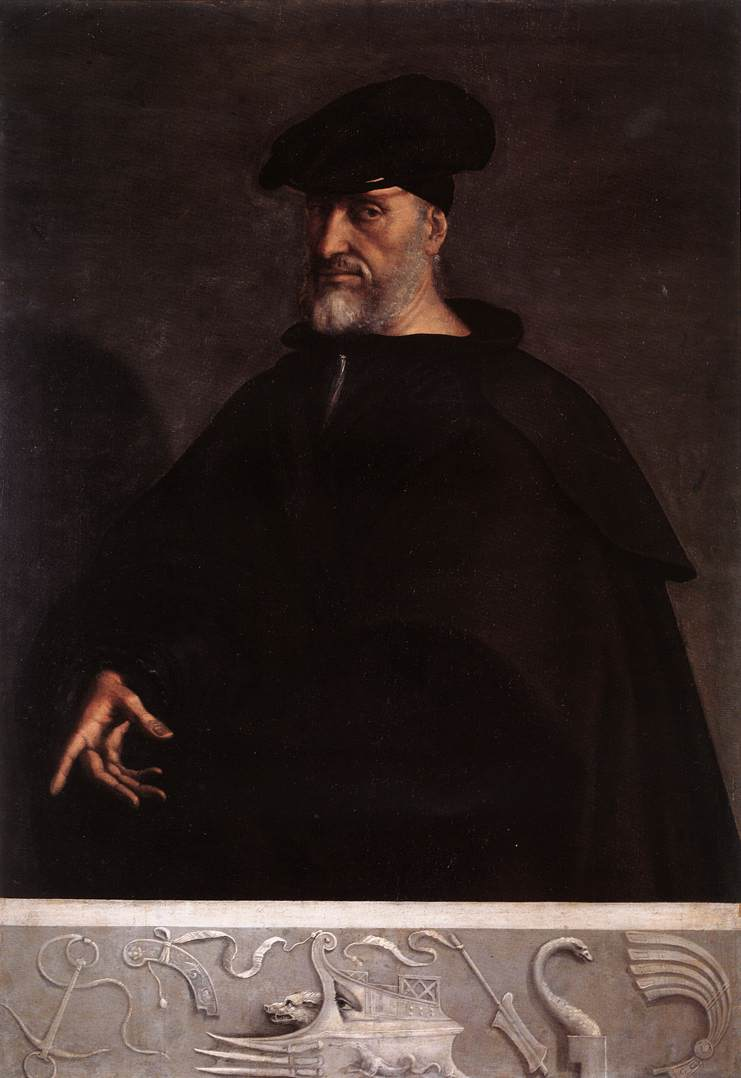
Andrea Doria

- Alamanno da Costa, admiral
- Andrea Doria, condottiero and admiral
- Lamba Doria, Genoese admiral who defeated the Venetians in the Battle of Curzola
- Guglielmo Embriaco, merchant and military leader
- Stefanina Moro, resistance member during World War II
- Luigi Durand de la Penne, naval diver during World War II
- Raffaele Rossetti, engineer and military naval officer
- Athanase-Charles-Marie Charette de la Contrie, French royalist, noble, military commander of the Papal Zouaves

== Patriotic figures ==
- Balilla, Genoese boy who started the revolt against the Habsburgs
- Nino Bixio, patriot
- Goffredo Mameli, patriot, author of Italian national anthem, Il Canto degli Italiani
- Giuseppe Mazzini, patriot, politician, journalist, writer, activist

== Political ==
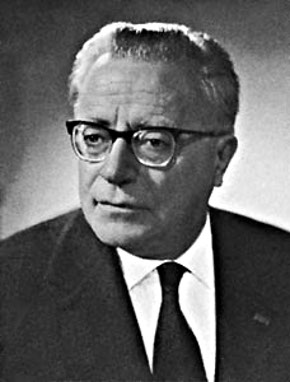
Palmiro Togliatti

- Prince of Belmonte
- Simone Boccanegra, Doge of Genoa
- Giovanni Battista Borea d'Olmo, politician
- Giuseppe Dossetti, jurist, politician, Catholic priest
- Bartolomeo di Passano, senator of the Republic of Genoa
- Gaetano Perillo, politician
- Caffaro di Rustico da Caschifellone, diplomat
- Palmiro Togliatti, politician

== Religious ==
- Andrea Gallo, presbyter
- Catherine of Genoa, saint and mystic
- Baldassare Ravaschieri, Roman Catholic priest, beatified in 1930
- Giuseppe Siri, Archbishop of Genoa

=== Popes ===
- Pope Adrian V
- Pope Benedict XV
- Pope Innocent IV
- Pope Innocent VIII

== Science and academia ==
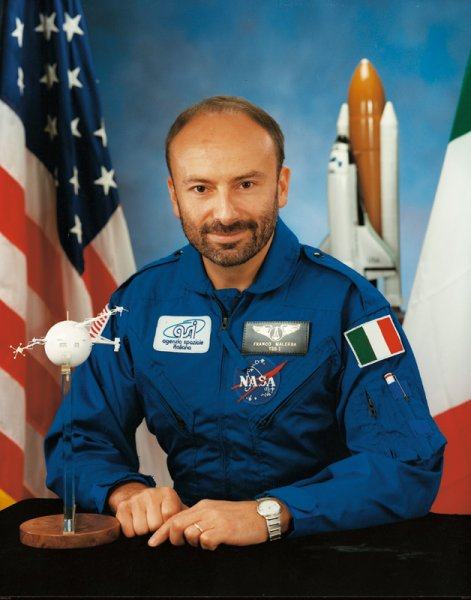
Franco Malerba

- Franco Malerba, astronaut, first citizen of Italy to travel to space.
- Giovanni Battista Baliani, mathematician, physicist and astronomer
- Massimo Boninsegni, physicist
- Luigi Luca Cavalli-Sforza, geneticist
- Germano Celant, art historian
- Laura Crispini, geologist and Antarctic researcher
- Alberto Diaspro, physicist and engineer
- Ausonio Franchi, philosopher and editor
- Riccardo Giacconi, astrophysics, Nobel Prize in Physics
- Lorenzo Pareto, geologist and statesman
- David Veronese, economist
- Valter Longo, biogerontologist and cell biologist

== Sport ==
- Federico Chiesa, football player
- Ezio Borgo, football player
- Abramo Canka, basketballer
- Luigi Cappanera, retired football player
- Francesca Carbone, 400m athlete
- Maura Fabbri, footballer
- Emilio Gattoronchieri, footballer
- Oliviero Mascheroni, footballer
- Mattia Monticone, footballer
- Matteo Rossi, footballer
- Fabio Valente, footballer
- Mario Ventimiglia, footballer
- Alice D'Amato, artistic gymnast
- Asia D'Amato, artistic gymnast
