= Abbate =

Abbate and L'Abbate is an Italian surname. Notable people with the surname include:

- Allison Abbate (born 1965), American film producer
- Anthony Abbate, American former Chicago police officer and criminal
- Carlo Abbate (c. 1600–before 1640), Italian music theorist, composer, and Franciscan priest
- Carmelo Abbate (born 1971), Italian journalist
- Carolyn Abbate (born 1956), American musicologist
- Ercole Abbate or Abate or Abati (1573–1613), Italian Mannerist painter
- Federica Abbate (born 1991), Italian songwriter
- Fliura Abbate-Bulatova (born 1963), former Soviet and then Italian table tennis player
- Florencia Abbate (born 1976), Argentine writer, poet, and journalist
- Giuseppe L'Abbate (born 1985), Italian politician
- Janet Abbate (born 1962), American computer scientist
- Jessie Abbate, American sport shooter
- Jon Abbate (born 1985), former American football player
- Leonardo Abbate, better known by his stage name Glovibes, Italian DJ and producer
- Lirio Abbate (born 1971), Italian journalist
- Mario Abbate (1927–1981), Italian singer
- Matteo Abbate (born 1983), former Italian footballer
- Michele Abbate, American racing driver
- Paolo Abbate (1884–1973), Italian-born sculptor
- Paul Abbate, American law enforcement officer, deputy director of the FBI
- Peter Abbate (born 1949), American politician
- Simona Abbate (born 1983), Italian water polo player

== See also ==
- Abate (disambiguation)
- Abbot
- Abatte
- Abbati
