= Soil sloughing =

Soil sloughing is soil falling off banks and slopes due to a loss in cohesion. Soil sloughs off for the same reasons as landslides in general, with very wet soil being among the leading factors. Sloughing is a relatively shallow phenomenon involving the uppermost layers of the soil. Bare soils are more likely to slough than soils with plant cover in part because the roots help hold the surface against gravity. Unabated soil sloughing can end in massive bank or slope failure.

== Impact on soil quality ==
According to the Mohr-Coulomb equation, the cohesion of a soil is defined as the shear strength at zero normal pressure on the surface of failure. The shear force is a function of cohesion, normal stress on rupture surface, and angle of internal friction. Shear force is significantly impacted by drainage conditions. Increasing water content would lead to a weaker shear strength, which in turn decreases the cohesion, leading to soil sloughing.

=== Vegetation ===
The likelihood of soil sloughing can increase after vegetation is removed along banks and slopes. Vegetation provides root strength and modifies the saturated soil water regime to stabilize the soil. Plant roots can anchor into cracks in bedrock through soil mass and can pass through weak areas to more stable soils to provide interlocking long-fibre binders in weak soil blocks. The contribution of trees to slope stability (root reinforcement) is mainly ensured by large roots.

=== Soil Water ===
Due to precipitation, seasonal changes in Water content can lead to soil sloughing. Soil sloughing is also an indicator of active soil movement and frequently requires action to reduce or prevent bank and slope failure. Soil water content is highly related to the mass erosion that leads to soil sloughing or even slope failure. Active pore water pressure can reduce the shear strength by up to 60% and lower cohesion through leaching and eluviation. The loss of root strength following harvesting decreases the safety factor to a level where a moderate storm with associated pore water pressure rise can result in slope failure, despite increased root reinforcement thereafter. Vegetation helps removing some excess soil moisture by evapotranspiration. Most slope failures by storms occur when the soil is saturated. Moreover, Soil moisture in deforested areas is higher than in forested areas.

== See also ==
- Cave-in
- Cave-in (excavation)
- Slump (geology)
- Soil stabilization
