= Volker Liebig =

German geophysicist

Volker Liebig (born 3 September 1956) is a German geophysicist and honorary professor at the Institute of Space Systems at the University of Stuttgart.

From 2004 to 2016, he was Director of the European Space Agency's (ESA) Earth observation programmes and Head of the ESA Centre for Earth Observation (ESRIN) in Frascati near Rome.

During his tenure at ESA, the space component of the European environmental observation system Copernicus with the Sentinel satellites was established.

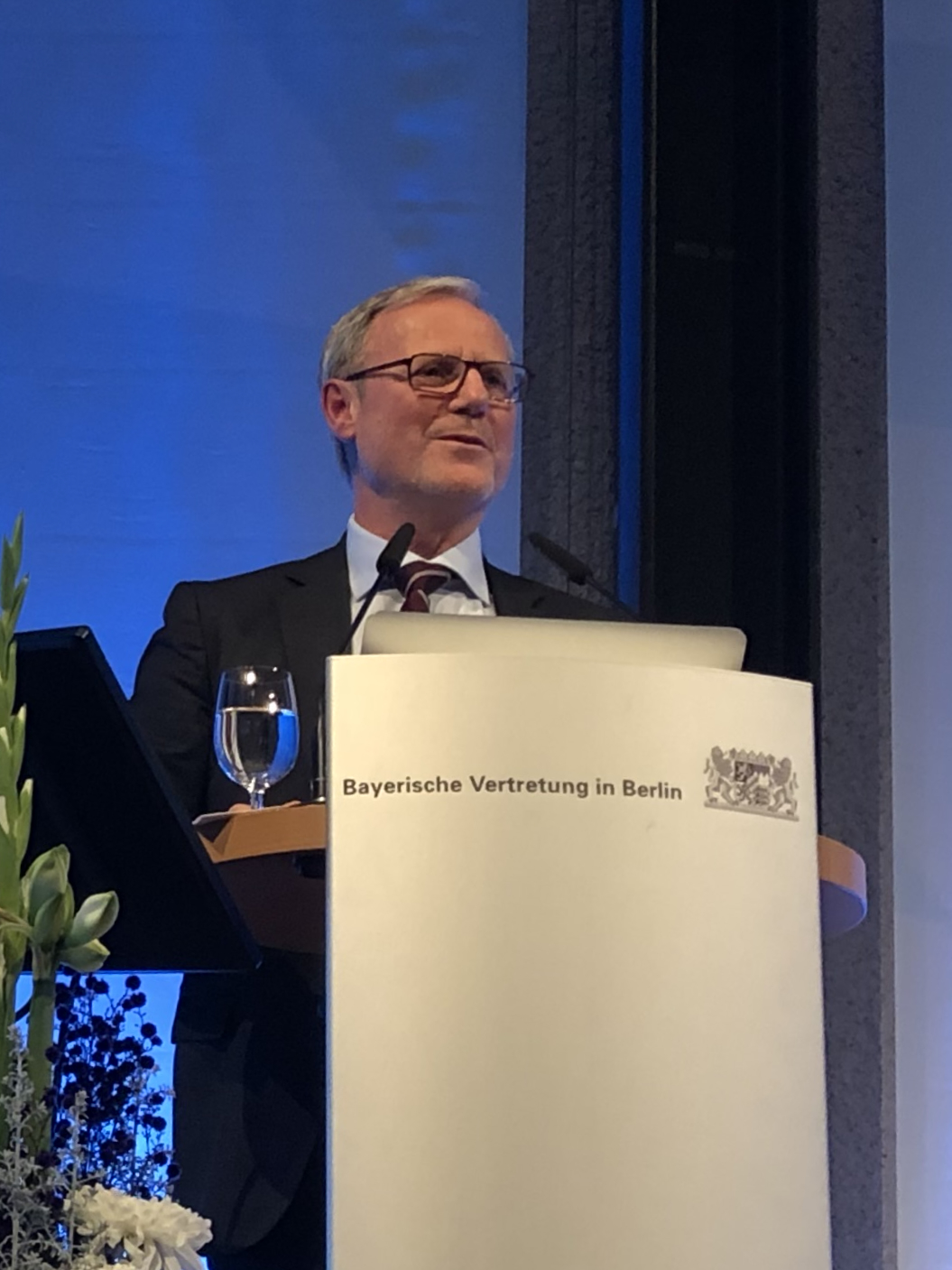

== Career ==
Liebig studied geophysics at LMU Munich.

He participated in the German Antarctic North Victoria Land Expedition (GANOVEX IV) in 1984/85, and his doctoral research included magnetotelluric measurements in Antarctica.

From 1993 to 2004 he held various management positions at the German Space Agency (DARA), which was merged in 1997 with the German Aerospace Center (DLR).

He has been teaching at the University of Stuttgart since 2002, and was appointed honorary professor in 2010.

Since leaving ESA, Liebig has also pursued artistic photography.

== Honours ==
- In 1985, a mountain spur in East Antarctica was named after him.
- In 2018, the German Society for Aeronautics and Astronautics (DGLR) awarded him the Eugen Sänger Medal for his services to space-based Earth observation, meteorology and climate research and the development of the Sentinel satellite series.
- In 2026, Liebig was awarded the Cross of Merit on Ribbon of the Order of Merit of the Federal Republic of Germany.
