= Abate =

Abate may refer to:

- Abate (surname)
- A brand name for the insecticide temefos
- ABATE, a motorcycle and motorcyclist rights organization
- The Italian word for abbot and abbé

== See also ==
- Abatement (disambiguation)
- Abbate
- Abatte
