= Abatte =

Abatte is both a surname and a given name. Notable people with the name include:

- Julio Abatte, Argentine footballer
- Abatte Barihun (born 1967), Israeli jazz saxophonist and composer

== See also ==
- Abate (disambiguation)
- Abbate
