= Ventimiglia (disambiguation) =

Ventimiglia is a city in Liguria, Italy near the French border.

Ventimiglia may also refer to:

== Places ==
- Ventimiglia di Sicilia, a city in Sicily, Italy
- Castle of Ventimiglia (or castle of Bonifato), ancient castle built at the end of the 14th century by the Ventimiglia family
- Ventimiglia Vineyard, a winery in New Jersey
- Genoa–Ventimiglia railway, railway running along the coast of the Liguria region of Italy
- Marseille–Ventimiglia railway, 259-kilometre long railway line running between France and Italy

== People ==
- Ventimiglia family, an Italian noble family
- Cesare Ventimiglia (1573–1645), Roman Catholic prelate who served as Bishop of Terracina, Priverno e Sezze (1615–1645)
- Gerolamo Ventimiglia (1644–1709), Roman Catholic prelate who served as Bishop of Lipari (1694–1709)
- Giovanni Ventimiglia, Italian Professor for Philosophy
- Giovanni II Ventimiglia, 6th Marquis of Geraci (died 1553), 16th-century Italian nobility, Marquess of Geraci from 1436
- John Ventimiglia (born 1963), Italian-American actor
- Mario Ventimiglia (1921–2005), Italian professional football player, manager and chairman
- Milo Ventimiglia (born 1977), American actor
- Ugo Ventimiglia (died 1172), Italian cardinal
