= Mass movement =

Mass movement may refer to:

- Mass movement (geology), the movement of rock and soil down slopes due to gravity
- Mass movement (politics), a large-scale social movement
- Mass movement (biology), a type of movement in the digestive system
