= Abate (surname) =

Abate is a surname of Italian origin. Notable people with the surname include the following:

- Abiyote Abate (born 1980), Ethiopian long-distance runner
- Adamo Abate (990–c. 1060), Italian medieval Benedictine abbot
- Atnafu Abate (1931–1977), Ethiopian military officer and politician
- Beniamino Abate (born 1962), Italian football (soccer) goalkeeper
- Bob Abate (1893–1981), Canadian sports coach
- Carlo Maria Abate (1932–2019), Italian auto racing driver
- Carmine Abate (born 1954), Italian writer
- Catherine M. Abate (1947–2014), New York State Senator
- Emanuele Abate (born 1985), Italian athlete
- Getachew Abate (1895–1952), army commander and a member of the royalty of the Ethiopian Empire
- Giovanni Abate (born 1981), Italian footballer
- Greg Abate (born 1947), American jazz saxophonist, flautist, composer, and arranger
- Ignazio Abate (born 1986), Italian football (soccer) right back/midfielder
- Joseph Abate (1902–1994), American mobster
- Leul Abate (born 1954), Ethiopian airline pilot and victim of three hijackings
- Loris Abate (1928–2020), Italian jewelry designer and businessman
- Marco Abate (born 1962), Italian mathematician
- Mulugeta Abate, Ethiopian musician
- Rosa Silvana Abate (born 1963), Italian politician
- Thomas Abate (born 1978), American musician

== See also ==
- Abbate
