= Downhill creep =

Slow, downward progression of rock and soil down a low grade slope

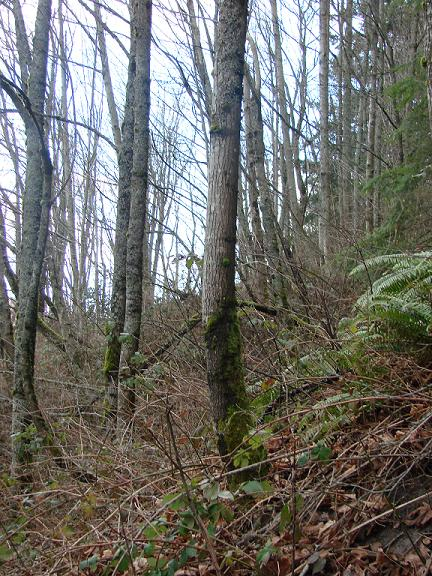
Trees showing the presence of creep

Downhill creep, also known as soil creep or commonly just creep, is a type of creep characterized by the slow, downward progression of rock and soil down a low grade slope; it can also refer to slow deformation of such materials as a result of prolonged pressure and stress. Creep may appear to an observer to be continuous, but it really is the sum of numerous minute, discrete movements of slope material caused by the force of gravity. Friction, being the primary force to resist gravity, is produced when one body of material slides past another offering a mechanical resistance between the two which acts to hold objects (or slopes) in place. As slope on a hill increases, the gravitational force that is perpendicular to the slope decreases and results in less friction between the material that could cause the slope to slide.

== Overview ==
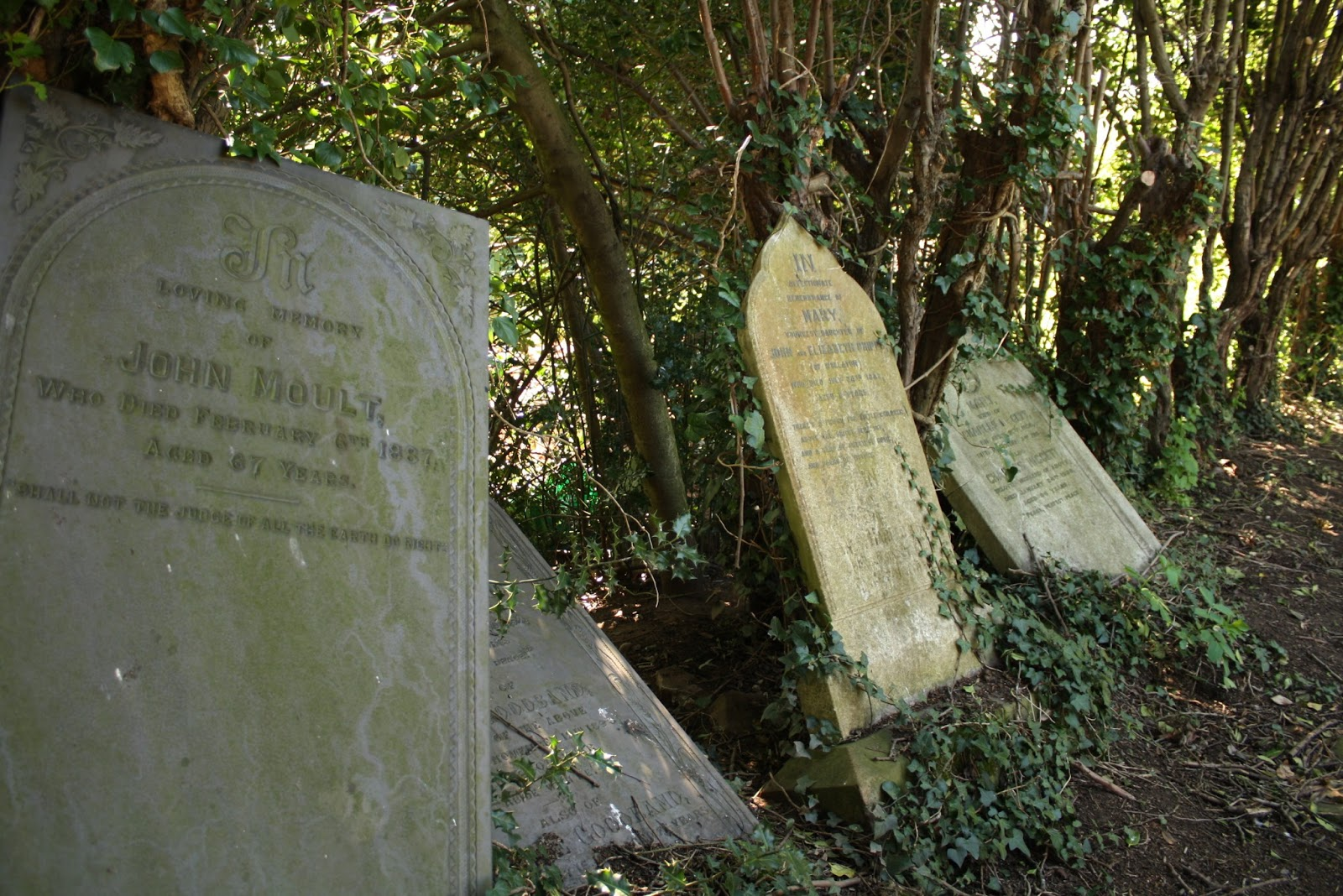
A group of Victorian headstones, England. Soil creep has led to the headstones being tilted at an angle over time.

Water is a very important factor when discussing soil deformation and movement. For instance, a sandcastle will only stand up when it is made with damp sand. The water offers cohesion to the sand which binds the sand particles together. However, pouring water over the sandcastle destroys it. This is because the presence of too much water fills the pores between the grains with water creating a slip plane between the particles and offering no cohesion causing them to slip and slide away. This holds for hillsides and creeps as well. The presence of water may help the hillside stay put and give it cohesion, but in a very wet environment or during or after a large amount of precipitation the pores between the grains can become saturated with water and cause the ground to slide along the slip plane it creates.

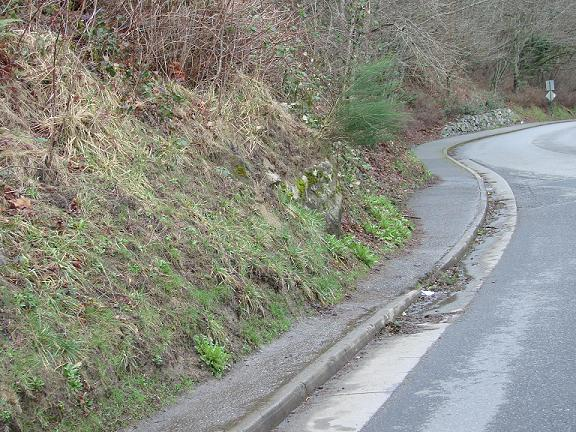
Creep has caused the soil to spread over this pavement.

Creep can also be caused by the expansion of materials such as clay when they are exposed to water. Clay expands when wet, then contracts after drying. The expansion portion pushes downhill, then the contraction results in consolidation at the new offset.

Objects resting on top of the soil are carried by it as it descends the slope. This can be seen in churchyards, where older headstones are often situated at an angle and several meters away from where they were originally erected.

Vegetation plays a role in slope stability and creep. When a hillside contains much flora their roots create an interlocking network that can strengthen unconsolidated material. They also aid in absorbing the excess water in the soil to help keep the slope stable. However, they do add to the weight of the slope giving gravity that much more of a driving force to act on in pushing the slope downward. In general, though, slopes without vegetation have a greater chance of movement.

Design engineers sometimes need to guard against downhill creep during their planning to prevent building foundations from being undermined. Pilings are planted sufficiently deep into the surface material to guard against this action taking place.

== Modeling regolith diffusion ==
For shallow to moderate slopes, diffusional sediment flux is modeled linearly as (Culling, 1960; McKean et al., 1993)

$q_s = k_d S \,\!$

where $k_d\,\!$ is the diffusion constant, and $S\,\!$ is slope. For steep slopes, diffusional sediment flux is more appropriately modeled as a non-linear function of slope

$q_s = \frac{k_d S}{1 - (S/S_c)^2}\,\!$

where $S_c\,\!$ is the critical gradient for sliding of dry soil.

On long timescales, diffusive creep in hillslope soils leads to a characteristic rounding of ridges in the landscape.

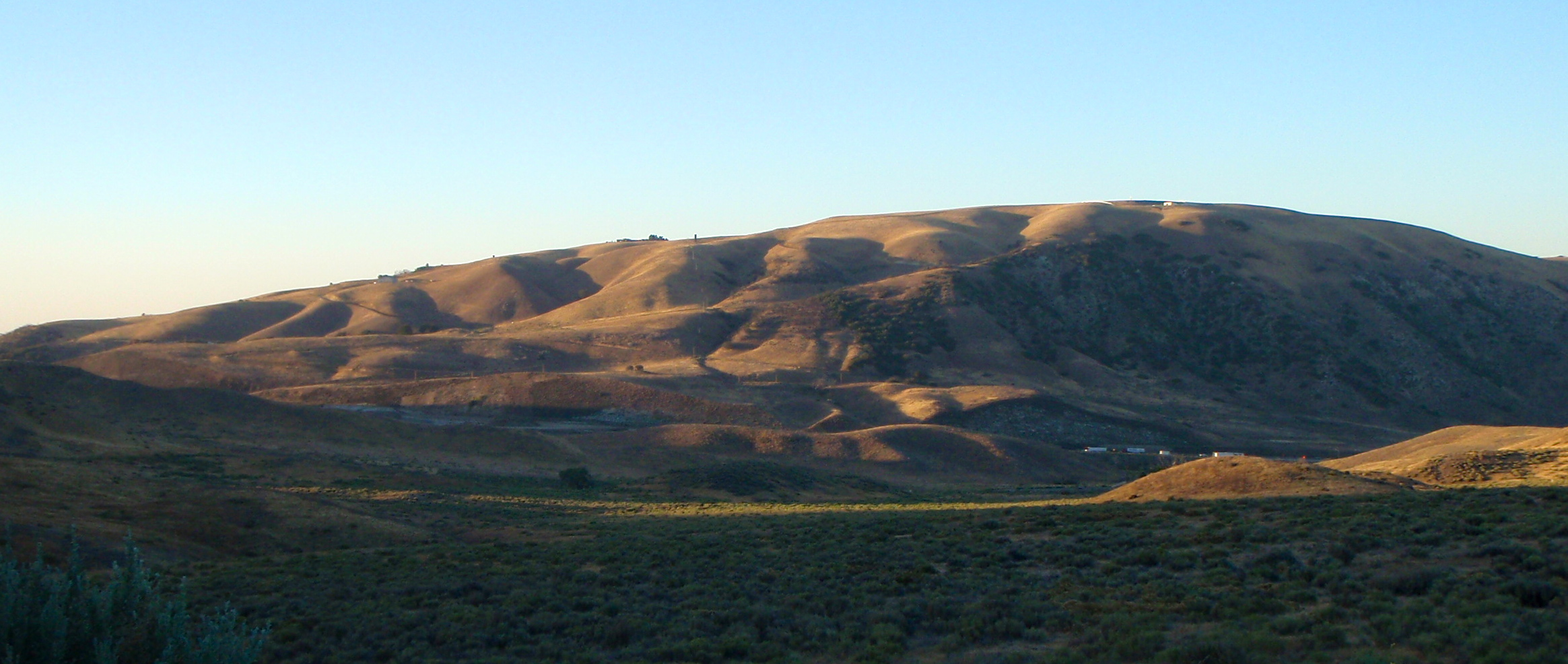
Convex hillslopes near Lebec, southern California, US. Creep in the underlying soils has produced the rounded form of the hilltops.

== See also ==
- Creep (deformation)
- Colluvium
- Mass wasting
- Sediment transport
- Solifluction

== Bibliography ==
- Culling, 1960.
- McKean et al., 1993.
- Monkhouse, F. J. (University of Southampton). A Dictionary of Geography. London: Edward Arnold (Publishers) Ltd. 1978.
- Roering, Kirchner and Dietrich, 1999. Evidence for nonlinear diffusive sediment transport on hilslopes and implications for landscape morphology. Water Resour. Res., 35:853–87.
- Strahler, Arthur N. Physical Geography. New York: John Wiley & Sons, 1960, 2nd edition, 7th printing, pp. 318–19
- Easterbrook, Don J., 1999, Surface Processes and Landforms, Prentice-Hall, Inc.
