= Mass wasting =

Movement of rock or soil down slopes

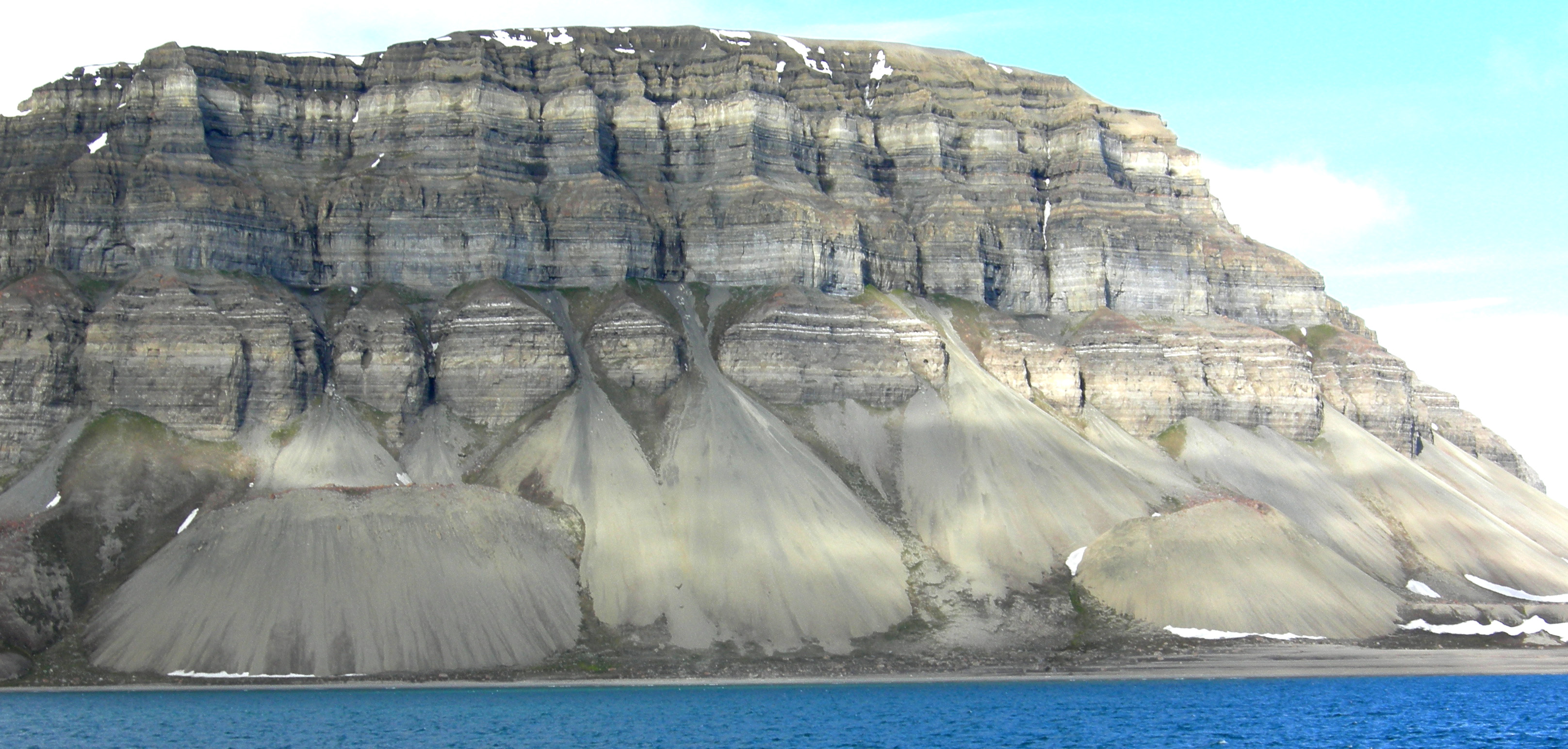
Talus cones produced by mass moving, north shore of Isfjord, Svalbard, Norway

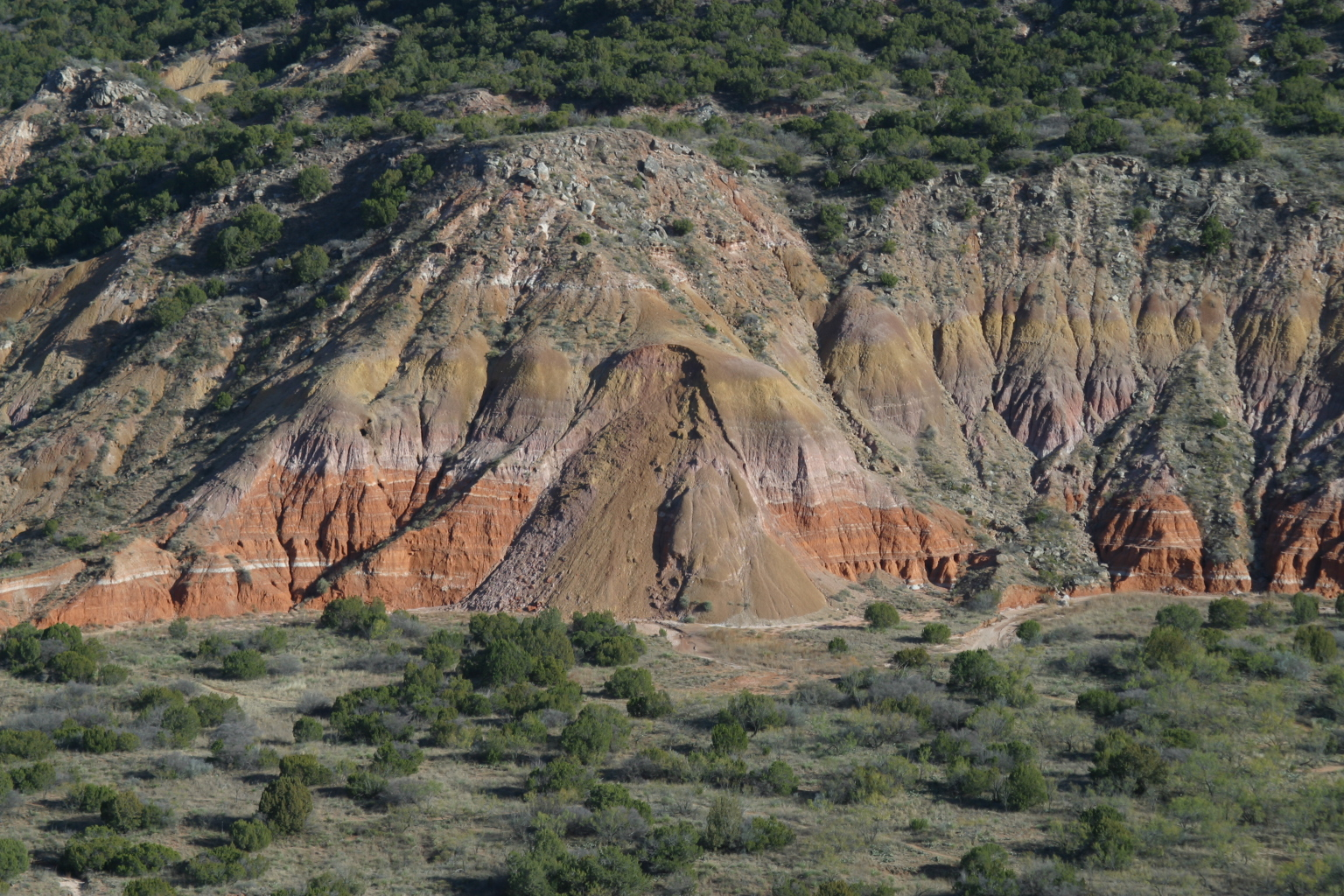
Mass wasting at Palo Duro Canyon, West Texas (2002)

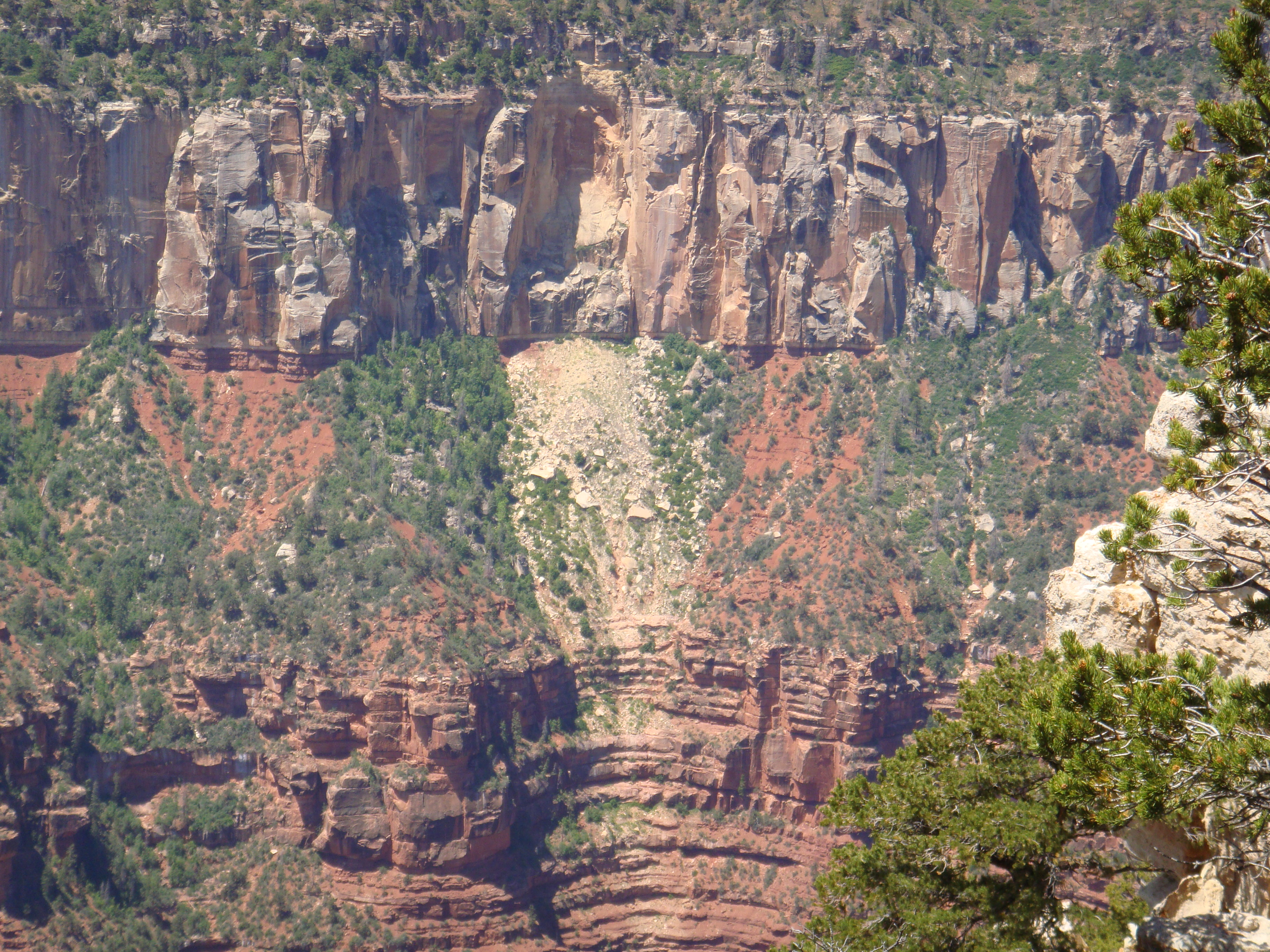
A rockfall in Grand Canyon National Park

Mass wasting, also known as mass movement, is a general term for the movement of rock or soil down slopes under the force of gravity. It differs from other processes of erosion in that the debris transported by mass wasting is not entrained in a moving medium, such as water, wind, or ice. Types of mass wasting include creep, solifluction, rockfalls, debris flows, and landslides, each with its own characteristic features, and taking place over timescales from seconds to hundreds of years. Mass wasting occurs on both terrestrial and submarine slopes, and has been observed on Earth, Mars, Venus, Jupiter's moon Io, and on many other bodies in the Solar System.

Rapid mass wasting events, such as landslides, can be deadly and destructive. More gradual mass wasting, such as soil creep, poses challenges to civil engineering, as creep can deform roadways and structures and break pipelines. Mitigation methods include slope stabilization, construction of walls, catchment dams, or other structures to contain rockfall or debris flows, afforestation, or improved drainage of source areas.

== Types ==
Mass wasting is a general term for any process of erosion that is driven by gravity and in which the transported soil and rock is not entrained in a moving medium, such as water, wind, or ice. The presence of water usually aids mass wasting, but the water is not abundant enough to be regarded as a transporting medium. Thus, the distinction between mass wasting and stream erosion lies between a mudflow (mass wasting) and a very muddy stream (stream erosion), without a sharp dividing line. Many forms of mass wasting are recognized, each with its own characteristic features, and taking place over timescales from seconds to hundreds of years.

Based on how the soil, regolith or rock moves downslope as a whole, mass movements can be broadly classified as either creeps or landslides. Subsidence is sometimes also regarded as a form of mass wasting. A distinction is then made between mass wasting by subsidence, which involves little horizontal movement, and mass wasting by slope movement.

=== Creep ===
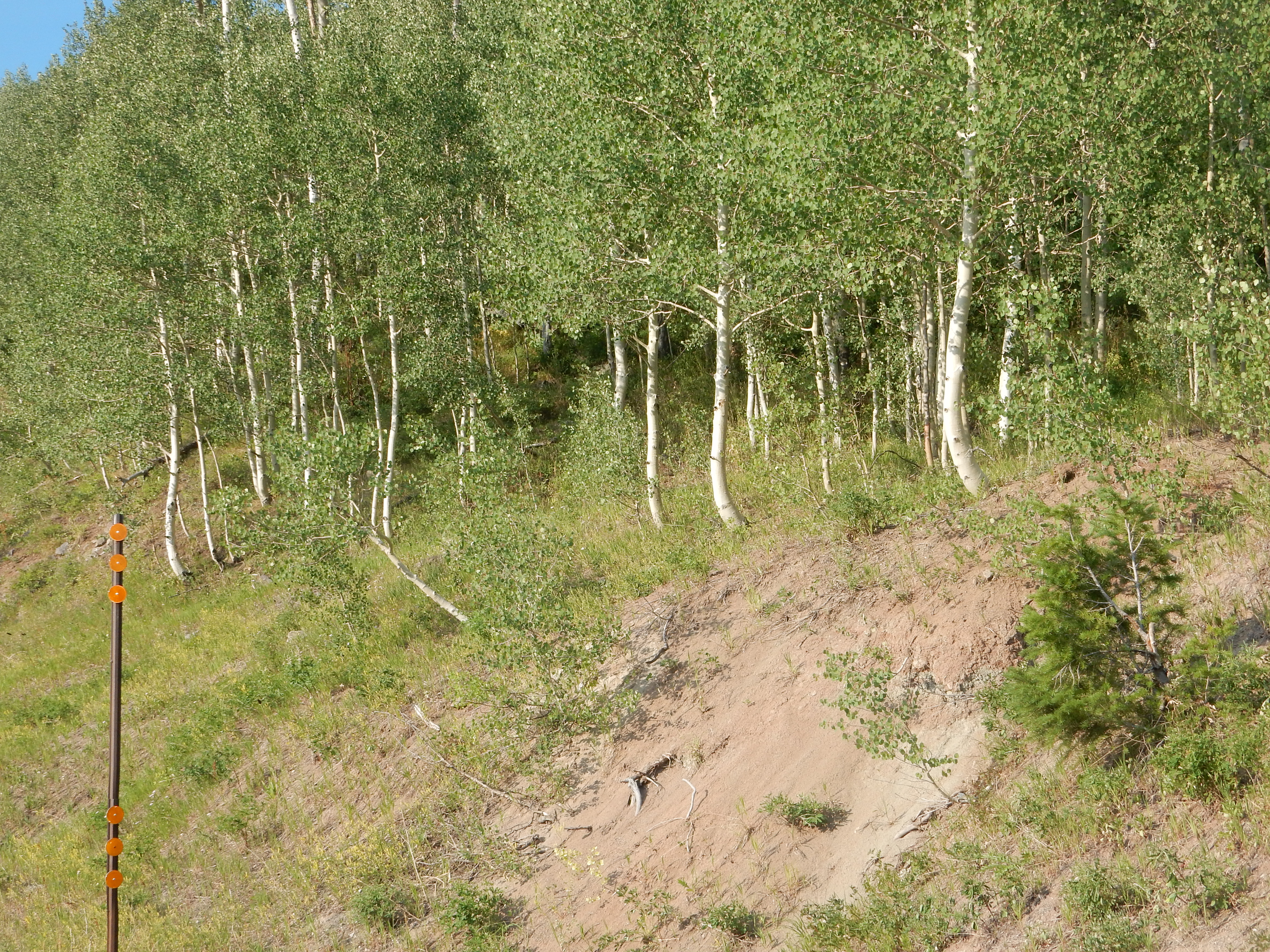
Curved tree trunks in an area of soil creep on Grand Mesa, Colorado, US

Soil creep is a slow and long term mass movement. The combination of small movements of soil or rock in different directions over time is directed by gravity gradually downslope. The steeper the slope, the faster the creep. The creep makes trees and shrubs curve to maintain their perpendicularity, and they can trigger landslides if they lose their root footing. The surface soil can migrate under the influence of cycles of freezing and thawing, or hot and cold temperatures, inching its way towards the bottom of the slope forming terracettes. Landslides are often preceded by soil creep accompanied with soil sloughing—loose soil that falls and accumulates at the base of the steepest creep sections.

==== Solifluction ====
Solifluction is a form of creep characteristics of arctic or alpine climates. It takes place in soil saturated with moisture that thaws during the summer months to creep downhill. It takes place on moderate slopes, relatively free of vegetation, that are underlain by permafrost and receive a constant supply of new debris by weathering. Solifluction affects the entire slope rather than being confined to channels and can produce terrace-like landforms or stone rivers.

=== Landslide ===
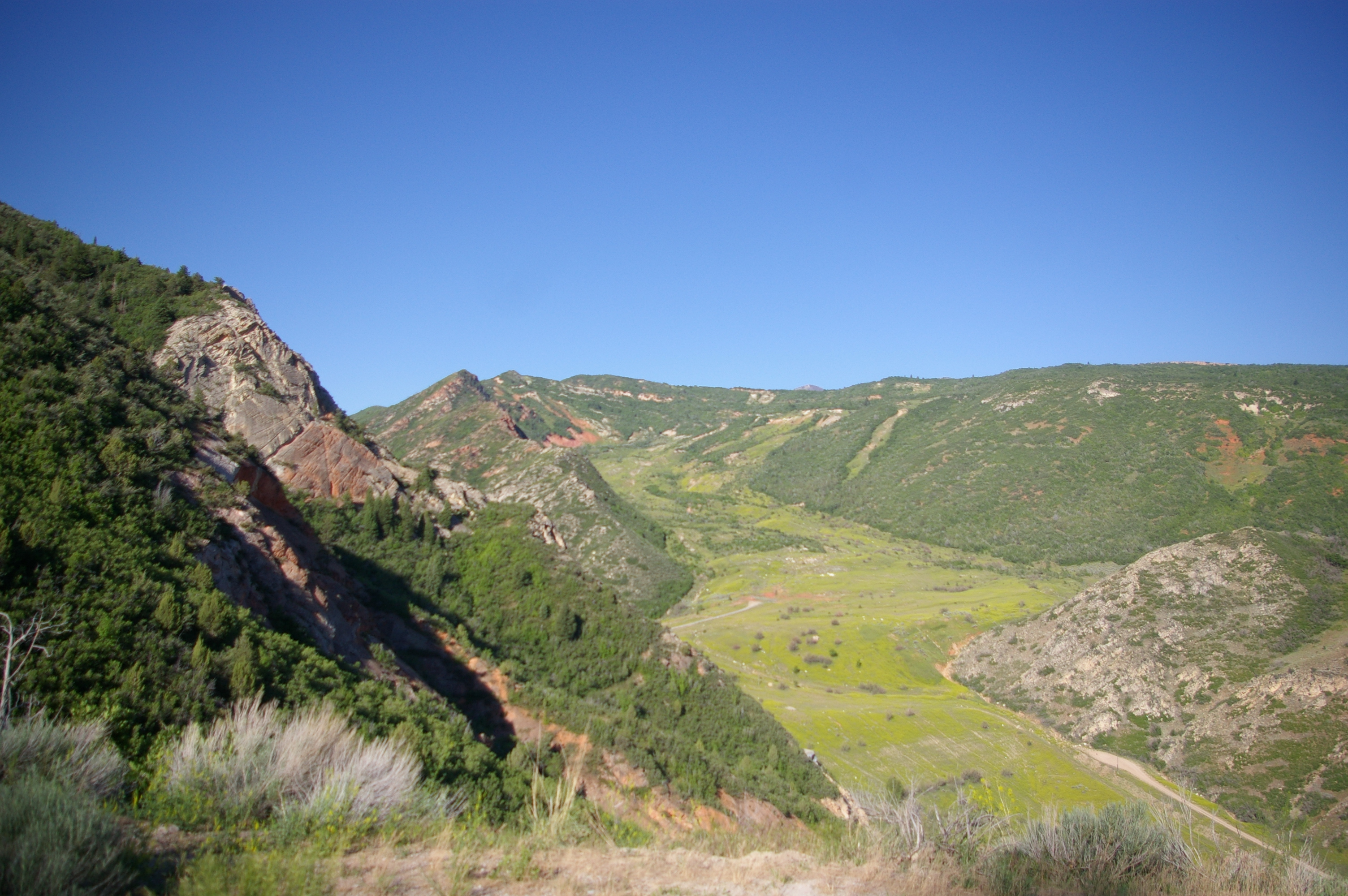
Thistle, Utah earthflow seen from US Route 6 rest area

A landslide, also called a landslip, is a relatively rapid movement of a large mass of earth and rocks down a hill or a mountainside. Landslides can be further classified by the importance of water in the mass wasting process. In a narrow sense, landslides are rapid movement of large amounts of relatively dry debris down moderate to steep slopes. With increasing water content, the mass wasting takes the form of debris avalanches, then earthflows, then mudflows. Further increase in water content produces a sheetflood, which is a form of sheet erosion rather than mass wasting.

== Occurrences ==
On Earth, mass wasting occurs on both terrestrial and submarine slopes. Submarine mass wasting is particularly common along glaciated coastlines where glaciers are retreating and great quantities of sediments are being released. Submarine slides can transport huge volumes of sediments for hundreds of kilometers in a few hours.

Mass wasting is a common phenomenon throughout the Solar System, occurring where volatile materials are lost from a regolith. Such mass wasting has been observed on Mars, Io, Triton, and possibly Europa and Ganymede. Mass wasting also occurs in the equatorial regions of Mars, where stopes of soft sulfate-rich sediments are steepened by wind erosion. Mass wasting on Venus is associated with the rugged terrain of tesserae. Io shows extensive mass wasting of its volcanic mountains.

== Deposits and landforms ==
Mass wasting affects geomorphology, most often in subtle, small-scale ways, but occasionally more spectacularly.

Soil creep is rarely apparent but can produce such subtle effects as curved forest growth and tilted fences and telephone poles. It occasionally produces low scarps and shallow depressions. Solifluction produces lobed or sheetlike deposits, with fairly definite edges, in which clasts (rock fragments) are oriented perpendicular to the contours of the deposit.

Rockfall can produce talus slopes at the feet of cliffs. A more dramatic manifestation of rockfall is rock glaciers, which form from rockfall from cliffs oversteepened by glaciers.

Landslides can produce scarps and step-like small terraces. Landslide deposits are poorly sorted. Those rich in clay may show stretched clay lumps (a phenomenon called boudinage) and zones of concentrated shear.

Debris flow deposits take the form of long, narrow tracks of very poorly sorted material. These may have natural levees at the sides of the tracks, and sometimes consist of lenses of rock fragments alternating with lenses of fine-grained earthy material. Debris flows often form much of the upper slopes of alluvial fans.

== Causes ==
Triggers for mass wasting can be divided into passive and activating (initiating) causes. Passive causes include:

- Rock and soil lithology. Unconsolidated or weak debris are more susceptible to mass wasting, as are materials that lose cohesion when wetted.
- Stratigraphy, such as thinly bedded rock or alternating beds of weak and strong or impermeable or permeable rock lithologies.
- Faults or other geologic structures that weaken the rock.
- Topography, such as steep slopes or cliffs.
- Climate, with large temperature swings, frequent freezing and thawing, or abundant rainfall
- Lack of vegetation

Activating causes include:

- Undercutting of the slope by excavation or erosion
- Increased overburden from structures
- Increased soil moisture
- Earthquakes

== Hazards and mitigation ==
Mass wasting causes problems for civil engineering, particularly highway construction. It can displace roads, buildings, and other construction and can break pipelines. Historically, mitigation of landslide hazards on the Gaillard Cut of the Panama Canal accounted for 55,860,400 cubic meters (73,062,600 cu yd) of the 128,648,530 cubic meters (168,265,924 cu yd) of material removed while excavating the cut.

Rockslides or landslides can have disastrous consequences, both immediate and delayed. The Oso disaster of March 2014 was a landslide that caused 43 fatalities in Oso, Washington, US. Delayed consequences of landslides can arise from the formation of landslide dams, as at Thistle, Utah, in April 1983.

Volcano flanks can become over-steep resulting in instability and mass wasting. This is now a recognised part of the growth of all active volcanoes. It is seen on submarine volcanoes as well as surface volcanoes: Kamaʻehuakanaloa (formerly Loihi) in the Hawaiian–Emperor seamount chain and Kick 'em Jenny in the Lesser Antilles Volcanic Arc are two submarine volcanoes that are known to undergo mass wasting. The failure of the northern flank of Mount St. Helens in 1980 showed how rapidly volcanic flanks can deform and fail.

Methods of mitigation of mass wasting hazards include:

- Afforestation
- Construction of fences, walls, or ditches to contain rockfall
- Construction of catchment dams to contain debris flows
- Improved drainage of source areas
- Slope stabilization

== See also ==
- Denudation
- Floater (geology)
- Slope mass rating
- Slump (geology)
