= Laura Crispini =

Italian geologist

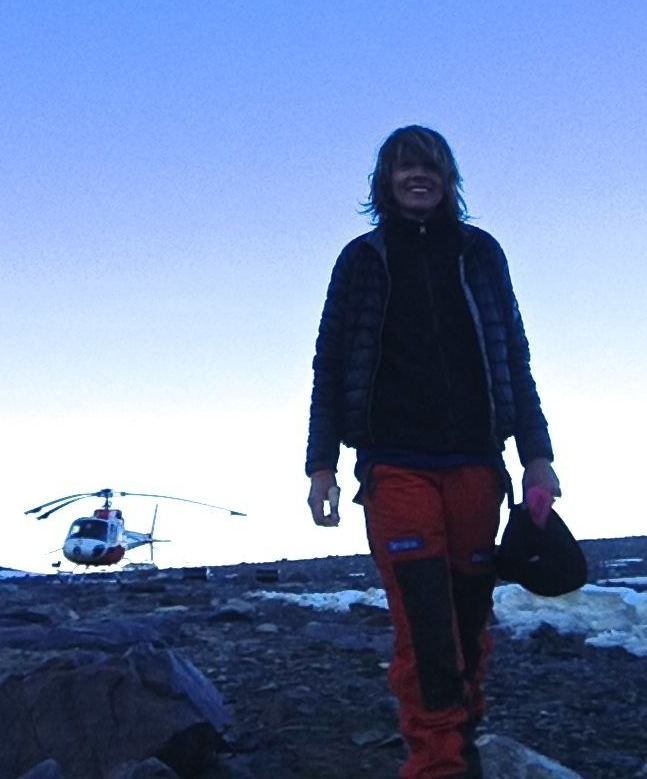
- Crispini in Antarctica
- Born: 2 May 1966 (age 60); Genova, Italy
- Education: University of Genoa
- Scientific career
- Fields: Structural Geology
- Workplaces: University of Genoa
- Website: www.researchgate.net/profile/Laura_Crispini

Laura Crispini (born 2 May 1966) is an Italian geologist and an Antarctic researcher. Her areas of expertise are for the Tectonics, Geodynamics and Geological Mapping including the Geology of Antarctica. She has been nominated among 150 International representative of female Antarctic researchers for the SCAR "Celebration of Women in Antarctic Research" wikibomb event. At present she is professor at the University of Genoa at the Department for Earth Sciences, Envinronment and life (DISTAV).

== Early life and education ==
Laura Crispini received her master's degree in geology (1990) University of Genoa, and obtained her PhD in Earth Sciences in 1995 while spending a training period in Structural Geology at the ETH Zurich. From 1996 to 1999, she was a Post-doctoral Researcher in Geology of Antarctica, at the University of Siena and at University of Genoa were in 1999 she got a position as a Researcher.

== Career and impact ==
Laura Crispini research is on the Tectonics and Geodynamics of Antarctica and the Paleopacific margin of Gondwana. She has travelled to Antarctica seven times for extended field research seasons, always working from remote field camps being the first Italian woman geologist, mapping for the international GIGAMAP project in 1996–97, and describing the first occurrence of native gold in the Antarctic continent in 2005-06 (Transantarctic Mountains, East Antarctica).

Crispini has been nationally and internationally recognized for her contributions to Antarctic Geoscience; she has been working on Antarctic Geology since 1992 first with two post PhD grants funded by PNRA and since 1996 she joined seven Scientific Expeditions in Antarctica as Field Geologist. (XII (1996–97)-XIX (2003–04) - XXI (2005–06)-XXX (2014–15)-XXXI (2015–16) - XXXII (2016–17) - XXXIV (2018-2019) Italian Antarctic Expeditions and the German Antarctic North Victoria Land Expedition GANOVEX XI (2015–16) and GANOVEX XII (2016–17) and GANOVEX XII - REGGAE Expedition in northern Victoria Land, working in the field from remote Field Camps,).

She's is Principal Investigator of the REGGAE Project, a project on the link between geophysical interpretations and field-based geological observations in Antarctica funded by PNRA in collaboration with Researchers from the CNR (Pisa Italy), BGR (Germany), University of Bremen (Germany) and BAS (British Antarctic Survey) and she has been P.I. of a PNRA funded Project on Geodynamics of Antarctica.

She is an active member of the SCAR group GEOMAP to promote the capture of existing geological map data, update its spatial reliability and enable data delivery via web feature services.

Laura Crispini is involved in the ABYSS ITN Training Network funded by the European Commission that aims at training a new generation of researchers in Geodynamics, Mineralogy, Hydrodynamics, Thermodynamics and (Bio)geochemistry focusing on mid-ocean ridge processes and their environmental and economic impacts. She worked as scientist in the ODP-IODP projects on the geology at Superfast Spreading Ridge joining scientific expeditions in the Pacific Ocean as petrologist and structural geologist (LEG 206 and Exp 309) on the Joides Resolution vessel.

== Selected works on Antarctica ==
- Capponi G., CRISPINI L. & Meccheri M. - 1999 - The metaconglomerates of the eastern Lanterman Range (northern Victoria Land, Antarctica): new constraints for their interpretation. - Antarctic Science, 11(2), 215–225........
- Capponi G., CRISPINI L. & Meccheri M. - 1999 - Structural history and tectonic evolution of the boundary between the Wilson and Bowers Terranes, Lanterman Range, Northern Victoria Land, Antarctica. - Tectonophysics, 312 (2-4), 249–266.
- CRISPINI L. & Capponi G. - 2002 - Albitite and listvenite in the Lanterman Fault Zone (northern Victoria Land, Antarctica). In Gamble, J., Skinner, D., and Henrys, S. (Eds.), Antarctica at the close of a Millennium, Royal Society of New Zealand Bulletin 35, 113 - 119.
- Capponi G., CRISPINI L. & Meccheri M. - 2002 - Tectonic evolution at the boundary between the Wilson and Bowers Terranes (northern Victoria Land, Antarctica): structural evidence from the Mountaineer and Lanterman Range. In Gamble, J., Skinner, D., and Henrys, S. (Eds.), Antarctica at the close of a Millennium, Royal Society of New Zealand Bulletin 35, 105 - 112.
- Federico L., Capponi G. and CRISPINI L. - 2006- The Ross orogeny of the Transantarctic Mountains: a northern Victoria Land perspective. - International Journal of Earth Sciences, DOI 10.1007/s00531-005-0063-5.
- Federico L., Capponi G., Crispini L. & Bradshaw J.D. - 2007 - The Cambrian Ross Orogeny in Northern Victoria Land (Antarctica) and New Zealand: A Synthesis. U.S. Geological Survey and The National Academies; USGS OF-2007-1047, Short Research Paper 063, doi:10.3133/of2007-1047.srp063.
- CRISPINI L., DiVincenzo G. and Palmeri R. - 2007 - Petrology and 40Ar-39Ar dating of shear zones in the Lanterman Range (northern Victoria Land, Antarctica): implications for metamorphic and temporal evolution at the terrane boundaries - Mineralogy and Petrology, 89: 217–249 doi: 10.1007/s00710-006-0164-2.
- Federico L, CRISPINI L., Capponi G, Bradshaw J.D (2009). The Cambrian Ross Orogeny in northern Victoria Land (Antarctica) and New Zealand: A synthesis. Gondwana Research, 15, 188–196.
- Federico L., CRISPINI L. and Capponi G. (2010) Fault-slip analysis and transpressional tectonics: a study of Paleozoic structures in northern Victoria Land, Antarctica. Journal of Structural Geology, 32–5, 667-684 ISSN 0191-8141, doi: 10.1016/j.jsg.2010.04.001.
- CRISPINI L., Federico L., Capponi G. and Talarico F.M. (2011) - The Dorn gold deposit in northern Victoria Land, Antarctica: structure, hydrothermal alteration, and implications for the Gondwana Pacific margin. Gondwana Research, vol. 19, p. 128-140 ISSN 1342-937X, doi: 10.1016/j.gr.2010.03.010.
- CRISPINI L., Federico L., Capponi G. (2014). Structure of the Millen Schist Belt (Antarctica): Clues for the tectonics of northern Victoria Land along the paleo-Pacific margin of Gondwana. TECTONICS, vol. 33, p. 420-440, ISSN 0278-7407, doi: 10.1002/2013TC003414.

GEOLOGICAL MAP of ANTARCTICA.

- Capponi G., Meccheri M., Pertusati P.C., Castelli D., CRISPINI L., Kleinschmidt G., Lombardo B., Montrasio A., G. Musumeci, G. Oggiano, C.A. Ricci, N.W. Roland, F. Salvini, D.N.B. Skinner, F. Tessensohn (1997). Antarctic Geological 1/250000 Map series. Mt Murchison Quadrangle, (Victoria Land).- with Explanatory Notes - Museo Nazionale dell'Antartide, Sezione di Scienze della Terra.
- Capponi G., M. Meccheri, G. Oggiano, R. Casnedi, L. CRISPINI, G. Kleinshmidt, A. Montrasio, P.C. Pertusati, N.W. Roland, F. Salvini, M. Schmidt-Thomè, F. Tessensohn (1997). Antarctic Geological 1/250000 Map series. Coulman Island Quadrangle, (Victoria Land). - with Explanatory Notes - Museo Nazionale dell'Antartide, Sezione di Scienze della Terra.
- Capponi G., CRISPINI L., Meccheri M. Musumeci G. & Pertusati P. - (2002) - 1/250000 Geological map of the Mt. Joyce, northern Victoria Land, Antarctica. - con Explanatory Notes - Museo Nazionale dell'Antartide, Sezione di Scienze della Terra.
- Capponi G., CRISPINI L., Meccheri M. Musumeci G. & Pertusati P. - (2002) - 1/250000 Geological map of the Relief Inlet, northern Victoria Land, Antarctica. - con Explanatory Notes - Museo Nazionale dell'Antartide, Sezione di Scienze della Terra.
- Capponi G., Meccheri M., Pertusati P., Carosi R., CRISPINI L., Musumeci G., Oggiano G., Roland N.W. & Tessensohn F.- (2014) Antarctic Geological 1/250000 Map series. Freyberg Mountains Quadrangle, (Victoria Land). Museo Nazionale dell'Antartide, Sezione di Scienze della Terra, Siena, Italy
- Pertusati P., Musumeci G., Carosi R., Meccheri M., Baroni C., Capponi G., Carmignani L., Castelli D., Colombo F., CRISPINI L., Di Vincenzo G., Ghezzo C., Gosso G., Lombardo B., Montomoli C., Montrasio A., Oggiano G., Perchiazzi N., Ricci C.A., Rocchi S., Salvini F., Skinner D.N.B., Talarico F., Tessensohn F. (2014). Antarctic Geological 1/250000 Map series. Mount Melbourne Quadrangle, (Victoria Land). Museo Nazionale dell'Antartide, Sezione di Scienze della Terra, Siena, Italy
