= Abated =

Technical term in masonry and metal work

See also, Abatement.

Abated is an ancient technical term applied in masonry and metal work to those portions that are sunk beneath the surface, as in inscriptions where the ground is sunk round the letters to leave the letters or ornament in relief.
