= Abatement =

Abatement refers generally to a lessening, diminution, reduction, or moderation; specifically, it may refer to:

- 421-a tax abatement, property tax exemption in the U.S. state of New York
- Abatement ab initio, a legal doctrine that, if the accused dies before appeals are exhausted, the conviction gets vacated
- Abatement of debts and legacies, a common law doctrine of wills
- Abatement in pleading, a legal defense to civil and criminal actions
- Abatement (heraldry), a modification of the shield or coat of arms imposed by authority for misconduct
- Asbestos abatement, removal of asbestos from structures
- Bird abatement, driving or removing undesired birds from an area
- Dust abatement, the process of inhibiting the creation of excess soil dust
- Graffiti abatement, a joint effort between groups to eliminate graffiti
- Marginal abatement cost, the marginal cost of reducing pollution
- Noise abatement, strategies to reduce noise pollution or its impact
- Nuisance abatement, regulatory compliance methodology
- Tax abatement, temporary reduction or elimination of a tax

== See also ==
- Abate (disambiguation)
