= Gaetano Perillo =

Italian politician

- Born: 1897; Genoa, Liguria, Italy
- Died: 1975
- Occupations: Politician, antifascist activist
- Political party: Italian Socialist Party; Italian Communist Party

Gaetano Perillo (1897–1975) was a 20th-century Italian politician from Genoa, northern Italy.

== Biography ==
Gaetano Perillo was a militant of the Arditi del Popolo. He is cited by historians as one of the leaders and organizers of antifascist defense squads in Genoa and other cities. He founded and directed until his death the journal Movimento operaio e socialista (Workers’ and Socialist Movement).

The Ligurian Center for Social History in the city of Genoa, located in the Doge’s Palace of Genoa, created a documentation collection known as the Perillo Fund, which includes original documents on working-class society in Liguria from 1848 to 1922 and on the antifascist struggle movement from 1920 to 1922.
