= Cavanna family =

Italian noble family

The Cavanna family is an old Italian noble family, originating in Northern Italy.

== Origins ==
It seems that the name first appeared historically in Genoa, and later in Piacenza. Nearby, a place called Cavanna di Lesignaro is to be found in the vicinity of Parma. In the center of the triangle Genoa-Piacenza-Parma lies the municipality of Ferriere, which includes the localities of Cassimoreno and Centenaro, and adjacent to the neighbouring municipality of Farini. This is a montane area where a high concentration of Cavannas exists historically.

== Aristocratic patrician lineage and titled nobility ==
The family has a coat of arms, indicating noble origins, and several distinguished noble members through the centuries. They are listed as one of the several noble families of the former Republic of Genoa, and during the Albergo period of the governance of Genoa, they formed part of the Albergo De Franchi, one of the 28 Alberghi of the Republic of Genoa.

An Albergo (Alberghi in plural) was an informal grouping, in which several families bonded around a dominant family. Families of an Albergo shared the same political views and economic interests. They usually lived near each other and attended the same churches.

The Cavanna (De Franchi) heraldic arms are portrayed in the Libro d'Oro della Nobiltà di Genova, published in 1920. The Cavannas were also feudal Lords of Castel Gazzo, which castle today survives in the town of Novi Ligure, just north of Genoa, and Patricians of Genoa.

One of the earliest historical references to the family is found in a record of Ida and Ottobonus de Cavanna of Genoa, during the period 1202–1226. In the last part of the 14th century, one of the three skillful lawyers ("valenti giuristi") commended by the famous lawyer Bartolomeo Bosco was Antonio della Cavanna. He was confirmed as Lord of the castle of Gazzo by the Comune of Genoa on 18 October 1397. During 1423, he was Console of the Comune of Genoa in Caffa and during the 1430 was Vicario in Pera, the Genoa's neighbourhood in Costantinopoli. In the 15th century, Galeazzo Cavanna (died circa 1480) was Signore di Castel Gazzo , a Patrician of Genoa, and aristocratic Nobile di Novi and of Tortona, and he married Orietta Fregoso of Genoa (1453–1494), who had a brother Rinaldo (1454–1498), a Knight of Saint John of Rhodes (Knights Hospitaller, later known as Knights of Malta), and Prior of Tortona. They were children of the Doge of Genoa, Pietro II and his wife Bartolomea Grimaldi of the House of Grimaldi rulers of Genoa and Princes of Monaco. A certain Gian Nicola di Gian Maria Cavanna is also recorded in Genoa in 1640.

Domenico Cavanna da Gropallo is found in records dating to 1700 in Casimoreno , a small fraction of the Comune di Ferriere. In 1794, Alba Cavanna became the third wife and Countess of Marco Antonio Arcelli (died 1812), Count of Monteventano, Montebissago, Veratto, and Valle Luretta. His sister Nobile Caterina married Nobile Manfredo Cavanna Pacchiarotti. Their aunt, Nobile Ippolita married Nobile Antonio Cavanna Pacchiarotti (died 1751). Another relative, Nobile Maria Teresa Cavanna Pacchiarotti (died 1748) married Conte Cesare Caracciolo, descendant of Antonio Caracciolo (died 1504), Count of Macerato, Statto, Fiorano, Pozzolo, Fabiano, Raglio and Spettino, Governor of Pavia, and a Patrician of Naples who served for the Duke of Milan.

Don Giuseppe Cavanna was initiator and first director of Il Resegone, the first edition of which appeared in Lecco on 17 February 1882 as a response to national political turmoil and rampant laicization and anti-clericalism. Don Cavanna ensured a catholic perspective on social problems, influenced by the encyclical of Pope Leo XIII, Rerum novarum on rights and duties of capital and labour, and the conditions of the working classes, enunciating workers' rights and the right to property; the Roman Question; and in order to fight corruption in public life. Don Cavanna held that religion must be the fundamental basis of all values, and that truth and justice should be upheld rigorously. His legacy endures as the periodical continues in its 127th year .

== Coat of arms ==
The Cavanna arms consist of a shield gules a bend argent from the dexter fess to the sinister base, in chief an eagle sable displayed, the head to the dexter, under a crown or. This displayed black eagle in chief under a crown was the capo dell'Impero, and derives from Frederick I, Holy Roman Emperor, first of the Hohenstaufen dynasty of Emperors, who was crowned by Pope Adrian IV in 1155. Its origin in Genovese nobility hails from 1161, when the then-ambassador of Genoa to the court of Frederick I in Pavia was granted that concession. The Cavanna heraldic motto is "Iurista Sapiens".

== Early migration and diaspora ==
Today, a concentration of descendant Cavannas is found in the locality of Cassimoreno and the nearby village of Centenaro, near Ferriere, and which lie half-way between Genoa, Piacenza, and Parma. From Centenaro, Carlo Cavanna (1873–1925), left to Ethiopia, settling in Eritrea in 1888, at a very young age. He was one of the earliest pioneers, in search of prosperity, initially as an agriculturalist with an experimental farm at Godofelassi, just east of Adi Ugri, and south of Asmara. During the early part of the 20th century, and Italy's colonial administration of Eritrea, he directed the construction of the first railway line in Eritrea, and later established a citrus farm at Ghinda, an important station on the railway. His brother Andrea (1876–1950) remained in Centenaro and is one of several buried in the large Cavanna Mausoleum in Centenaro. Carlo had three children. One took over the Ghinda estate, sold it, and returned to Italy, while the other two and their families left Eritrea during Ethiopian imperial rule, and migrated to Sudan after World War II, and later returned to Europe.

Descendants for this branch of family members are found today in Pianello Val Tidone, Centenaro, Genoa, Livorno, Novi Ligure, Pisa, Rome, and other parts of Italy, and in England, Germany, and Switzerland.

Many other Cavannas emigrated from Italy to Britain, France, Buenos Aires in Argentina, Montevideo in Uruguay and to New York, New Jersey, and Pennsylvania in the USA.

== Notable contemporary members of the Cavanna family ==
- Carlo Cavanna, (1873–1925), Italian agricultural pioneer and first director of railway in Eritrea.
- Don Giuseppe Cavanna, (died 1902), Italian, founder and director of Il Resegone, a Catholic periodical.
- Elise Cavanna, (1902–1963), late American actress.
- Nicola Cavanna, (1916–1980), Italian, late Bishop of Rieti and of Asti Nicola Cavanna.
- François Cavanna, (1923–2014), French author and novelist.
- Bernard Cavanna, French composer and musical director.
- D. Cavanna, Italian geophysicist.
- J. M. Valdés Cavanna, Spanish general.
- Arturo Cavanna, Recognized Spanish professor and researcher on technology and education.
- Stefano Cavanna, Member of the Italian High Council of Judiciary , Consiglio Superiore della Magistratura, elected by the Italian Parliament in June 2018.
