= Bartolomeo di Passano =

Italian politician (1594–1650)

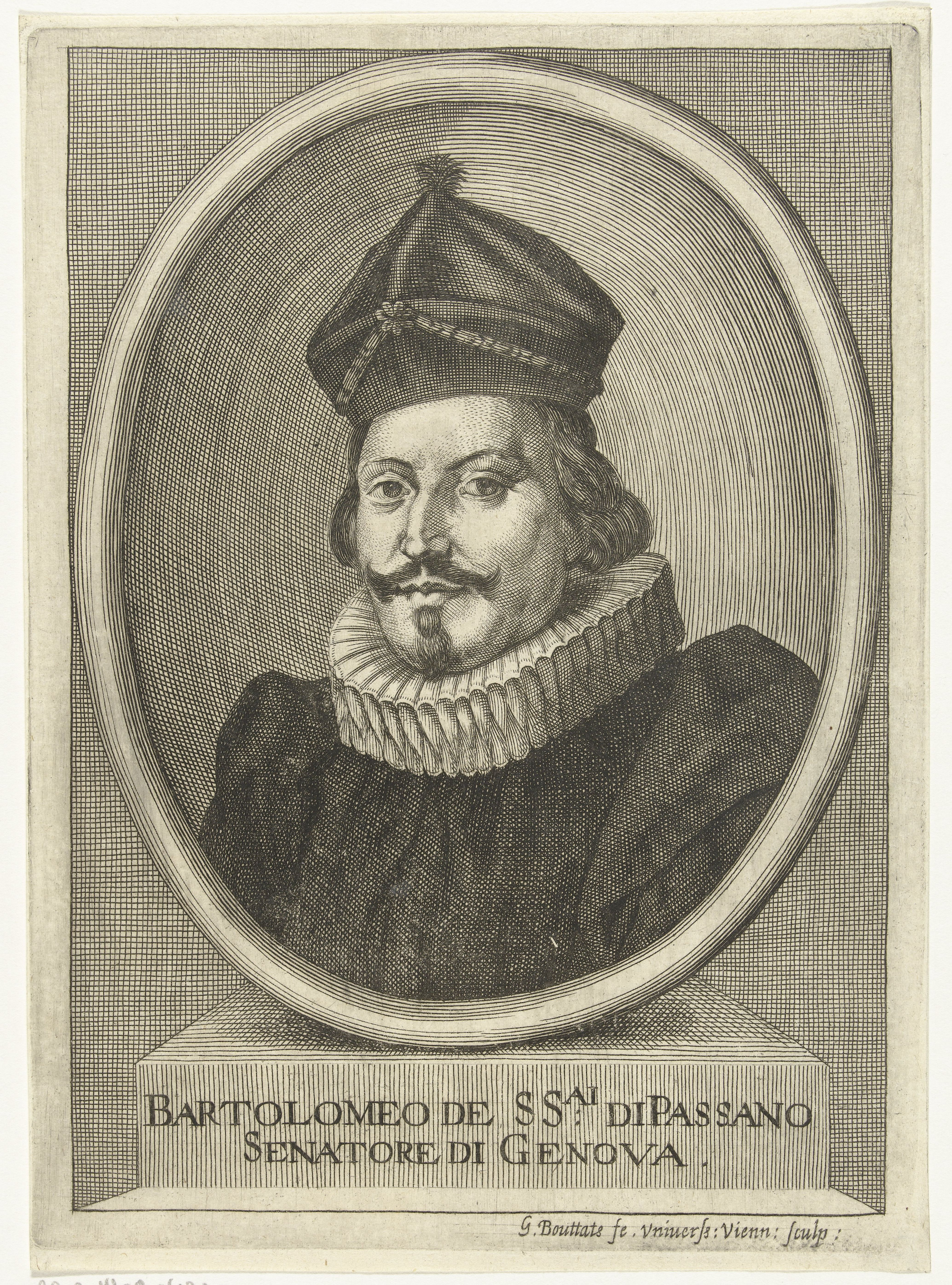
Portrait of Bartolomeo di Passano engraved by Gaspar Bouttats

Bartolomeo di Passano (1594 – 29 May 1650) was an Italian politician who was senator of the Republic of Genoa and Commissioner General of the armed forces.

== Family ==
Bartolomeo was born in 1594, the son of Stefano di Passano, a governor of Corsica, and Ortensia Bondenara. In 1624, he married Bettina Garbarina. They had two sons and two daughters.

== Career ==
In 1636, Bartolomeo became governor of Savona, but he resigned upon election to the senate soon afterwards. He was sent as ambassador extraordinary to France in 1639, to congratulate Louis XIII on the birth of his son, and again in 1643 to convey the Republic of Genoa's condolences on the death of Louis XIII and congratulations on the accession of Louis XIV. In 1645, he was again appointed Governor of Savona and Commissioner General of arms, in which capacity he was involved in the Battle of Orbetello (June 1646).

He died on 29 May 1650, aged 56.
