= David Veronese =

Italian economist

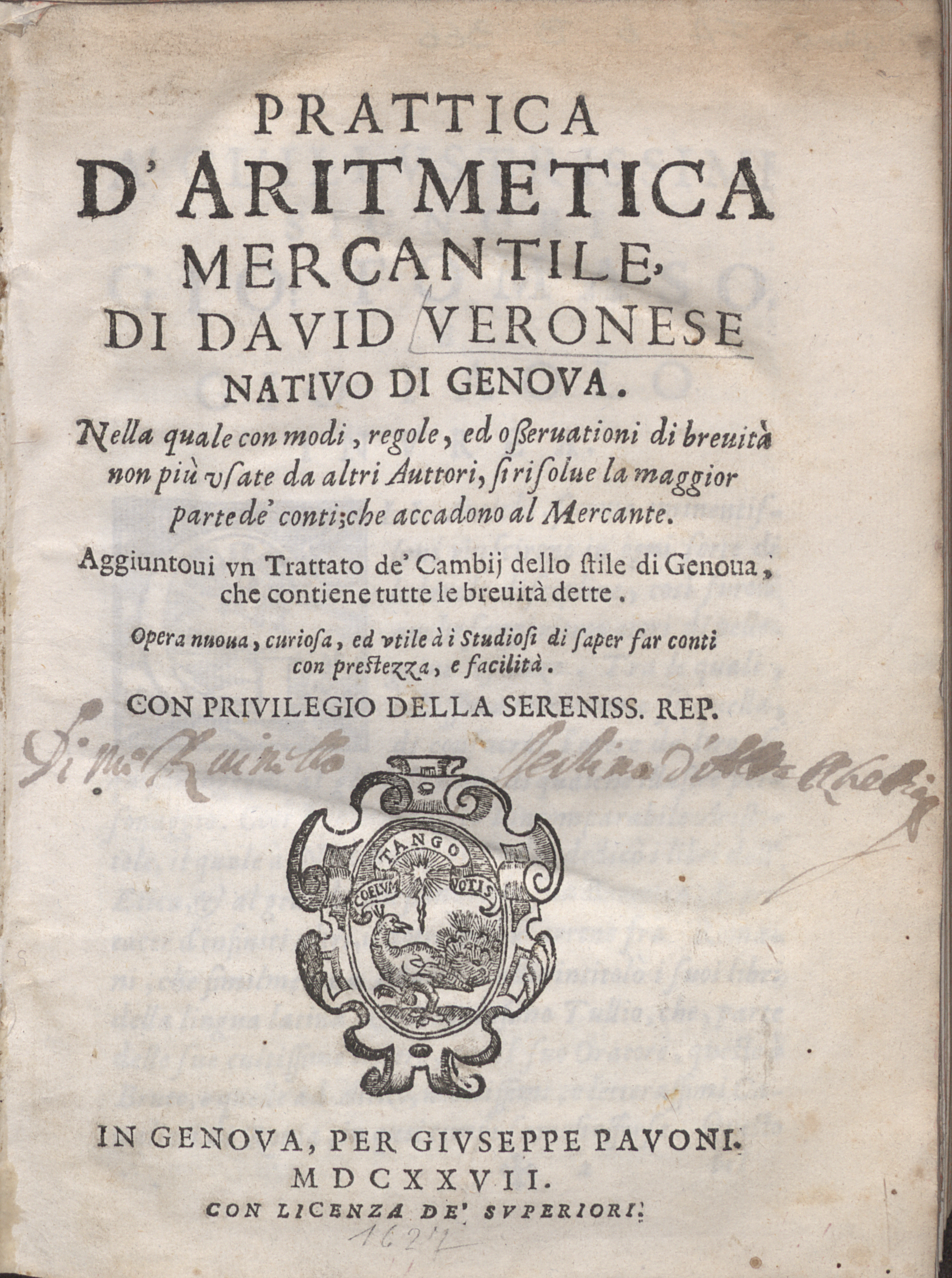
Prattica d'aritmetica mercantile, 1627

David Veronese (17th century) was an Italian economist from Genoa.

== Life ==
Veronese's works were considered milestones for the merchant business.

== Works ==
- Veronese, David (1627). Prattica d'aritmetica mercantile (in Italian). In Genoua: Giuseppe Pavoni.
- Veronese, David (1644). Aritmetica prattica per principianti (in Italian). In Genoua: Giovanni Maria Farroni.
