= Alberto Terrile =

Italian photographer (born 1961)

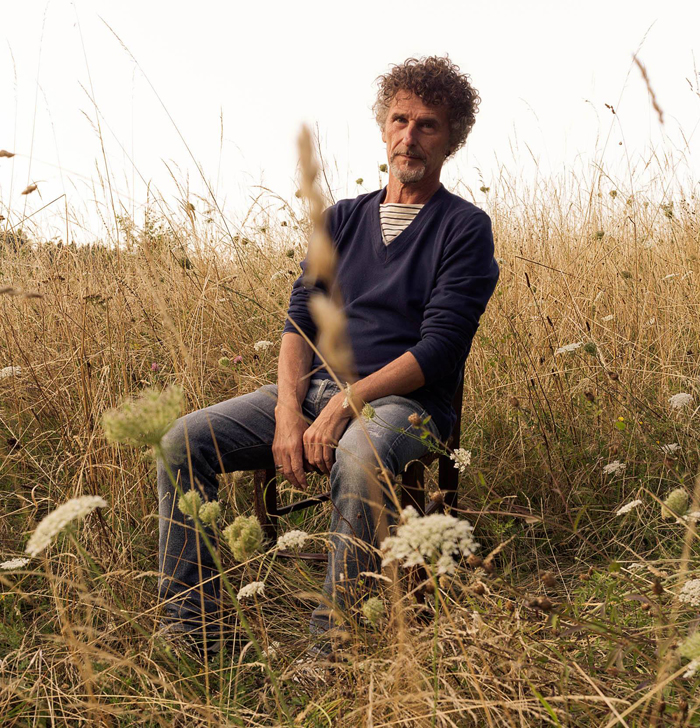
- Terrile, self-portrait taken in 2016 near Iola di Montese, a small village in the Apennine Mountains, Italy
- Born: 11 March 1961 (age 65); Genoa, Italy
- Known for: Photographer

Alberto Terrile (born 11 March 1961) is an Italian-born photographer. Mostly known in France, Italy and the US for his work-in-progress about angels, he is also active in publishing, theatre, music, cinema and advertising. He specialises in black-and-white portraits, for which he has won several prizes; his most acclaimed works include live performances of Corrado Rustici, Dee Dee Bridgewater and Ute Lemper. Personal expositions of his pictures have taken place in Milan, Rome, Berlin, Paris, Avignon, Chicago, Montreal and Toronto "Canada".

== Biography ==
Born in Genoa, Italy, 11 March 1961, of a middle-class family, Terrile shows a strong interest in the figurative arts since he is a child. His years until a teenager are spent in his home town, located on the sea and a prominent port of the Mediterranean, and Iola di Montese, a small village in the Apennine Mountains at the border of Tuscany and Emilia Romagna, where Terrile's family has a country house. The stark cultural and human contrast between the two places lies at the heart of his later artistic development; it is also probably at this time that Terrile develops his love for wild, uncontaminated nature (especially woods and mountains) and solitude – an attitude which is clearly visible throughout his work as a photographer.

=== Early years and education ===
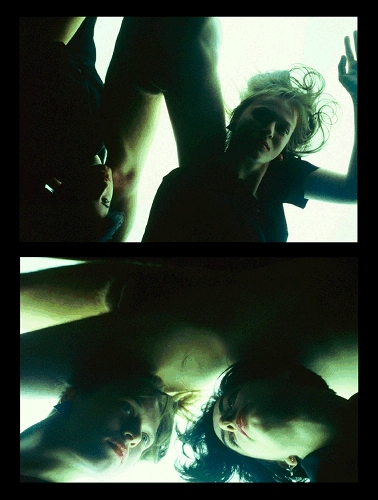
Fluttuare, parte II ("To float, part 2"), 1979

At the age of 14 Terrile enters the Artistic High School Nicolò Barabino of Genoa, officially as an apprentice painter. His natural attitude to painting and arts in general is not apparent, at least to his teachers, to the extent that in his first year he is suggested to move away from the artistic career and "find a good job instead." Nevertheless, after the high school and with the support of his parents, Terrile enters the Accademia Ligustica di Belle Arti (Ligurian Academy of Fine Arts) in Genoa, where he further pursues his interests in visual arts and music.

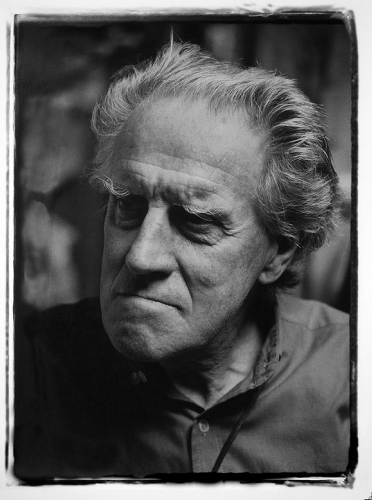
A portrait of the sculptor Lorenzo Garaventa, 1985

At the Academy, Terrile uses his fellow coursemates as models. The general atmosphere of rebellion against the rules and the desire to experiment lead him to realise, among others, a series of colour portraits shot in low key, almost monochromatic, but with overtly red lips or blue eyes. Bodies and faces are crammed into a single frame as if immersed in water or boxed in a fish tank. The set called Fluttuare ("To float") is a good example of his early style.

In these years his activity is extremely heterogeneous, ranging from analytic painting (a branch of abstract painting) to pop music and colour photography; among his early works, of remarkable value are Calligrafie ("Callygraphies"), Tracce ("Traces") and Segni ("Signs"), three series of portraits realised from 1977 to 1979 on large vertical surfaces, tape rolls, in video or with other heterogeneous materials. These series are finally collected in a work called Quelle improbabili immagini ("Those unlikely images") exposed in Genoa, Grosseto, Cosenza, Bari. In 1979–1980 he also writes an experimental score for alto sax for the contemporary composer Luca Barbieri-Viale called Cromofonie. The score will be played in Genoa, Milan and Certaldo, near Florence.

=== Apprenticeship in Milan ===
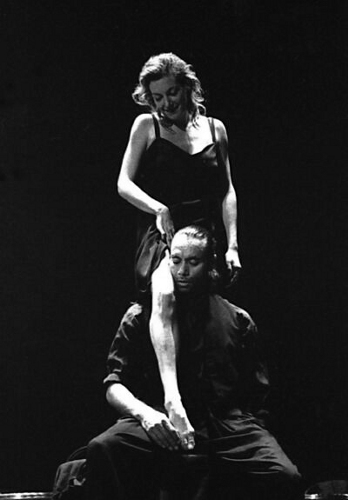
Live performance of Ute Lemper during the Illusion tour, 1992

By 1984, after successfully completing the Accademia, Terrile has found his way into photography and starts an apprenticeship in Milan, as the third assistant of Paolo Gandola, then a young but already renowned fashion photographer. During the 80s Milan develops its character as the Italian capital of fashion and finance; money becomes more and more the main engine of human relationships and corruption spreads at all levels of the local government. Not incidentally these years mark the rise of Silvio Berlusconi as a building and television entrepreneur. In a then famous commercial ad of the Ramazzotti liqueur, Milan is dubbed Milano da bere ("the Milan you can drink") with reference to the endless possibilities offered by the rampant capitalism, a lifestyle akin to that of the US, and so far unknown in Italy.

Terrile's simple, almost naïve attitude to life and people, and his total disregard of money, do not match the high style of the city of Milan. Terrile has little or nothing to do with Milano da bere, and after a few years he returned to Genoa. The technical teachings of Gandola are all he retained, plus a sheer rejection of fashion photography and all that revolves around it. In an interview shortly after his coming back, he says: "I find it unbearable that just four or five big photographers are freely allowed to give their vision of things [...] no more American faces! [...] beauty can as well be found on a bus, you need not look for it in Los Angeles or London."

In the same interview Terrile declares his love for cinema, which is just about to start shaping his style forever. Although he is only 25 years old, his artistic vision is already clear: "Cinema is, for me, Truffaut, Arthur Penn, Altman, Wenders [...] Randomness is a relatively important component of my works, but it is always under strict control [...] A photographer is always an artist and a craftsman at the same time." This last statement denotes the will to overcome the well-known problem every artist has to face in the beginning, namely that art does not pay. As a matter of fact, from 1985 on Terrile will be living off his activity as a pro photographer.

=== Artistic maturity ===
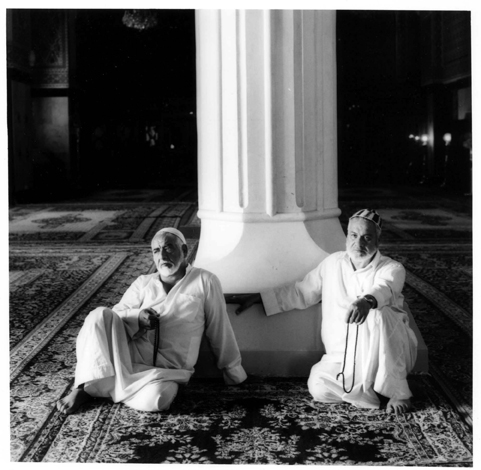
In moschea ("In the mosque"), Baghdad, Iraq, 1993

Terrile's return to Genoa marks the beginning of an all-round photographic activity. During these years he keeps in close touch with the vibrant artistic underground scene of Genoa. He attends artists of all sorts also outside the Academy; in particular, he develops a close friendship with the sculptor Lorenzo Garaventa. While in Garaventa's workshop, Terrile shoots a number of portraits of the artist himself, obtaining one of his most remarkable early pictures (1985). Particularly evident in this work is the use of natural light (in this case, coming from above) and the violent, sort-of expressionistic use of contrast obtained in the camera obscura. (An almost manic attention to printing is one of the long-standing traits of his work; Terrile has many a time acknowledged Stefano Grondona for teaching him his printing skills.)

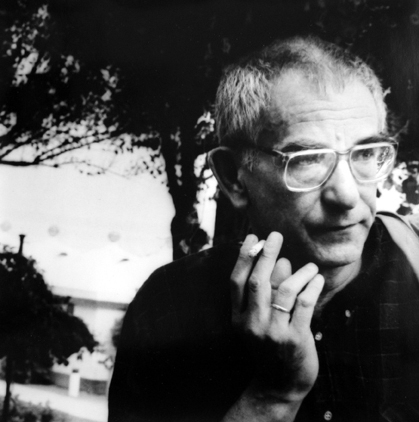
A portrait of the movie director Krzysztof Kieślowski at the Venice Film Festival, 1994

His commercial activity is initially deeply interwoven with music, especially live and studio performances. The list of artists he cooperates with includes at least Pierangelo Bertoli, René Aubry, Louis Winsberg, Marc Berthoumieux and Bob Wilber. Terrile also specialises in album and book covers, establishing links with the major Italian book editors (Einaudi, Zanichelli, Mondadori, Costa&Nolan).

As a freelance photographer his works appear on Le Monde, Diario della settimana, Glamour, Frigidaire, World Music. Live performance, in whatever artistic field and in natural light, becomes one of Terrile's favourite subjects, leading him to shoot, among others, Corrado Rustici and Dee Dee Bridgewater. His probably best known portrait-in-action is that of Ute Lemper taken during the Illusion tour in 1992, with the choreography by Larrio Ekson.

In 1993 Terrile is in Baghdad, Iraq to document the people's condition in the embargo-starved country, two years after the first Gulf war.

His style fully develops in this time, to the extent that he is awarded the Best Portrait of the Year prize by the magazine Progresso fotografico in 1989 and the Kodak European Gold Award in 1994 and 1995. In the same years he is one of the official photographers of the Venice Film Festival, an event which enables him to shoot some of his favourite cinematographers and actors, such as Krzysztof Kieślowski, Chazz Palminteri and Robert Altman. A complete exhibition of these pictures will eventually appear in a personal exhibition in Milan in 2000, ideally reconciling the city and the artist.

=== Experimental works; teaching ===
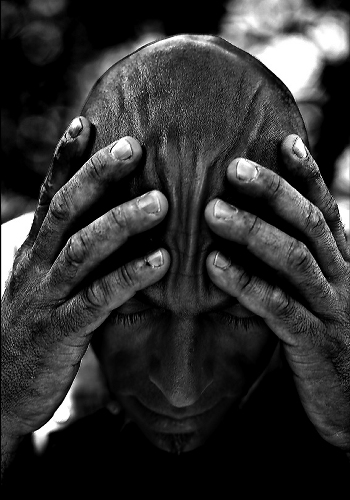
A portrait of Pasquale Montemurro from the series Dalla miniera, 2010

Terrile has kept on experimenting with non-standard techniques and materials, probably reminiscent of his early years at the academy. One notable example is the print of one of his pictures on light marble. According to Terrile himself, the negative was first printed on AGFA Record Rapid paper (at that time already out of production), then digitally acquired and plotted on a marble slab using a Durst Rho 205 special plotter. "After two trials on marble" Terrile says "I decided to raise the highlights, so that the natural grain of the marble would shine through and give an original volume to the model's white dress, with the effect of enhancing the sculptorial quality of my image." The final result was part of an exhibition of marble sculptures held in 2004 in Carrara, Italy.

Very unusual subjects, as well as a surrealistic use of post-production (in digital form too) and/or weird settings characterise some of his later production. Among the most original works, a set of portraits of disabled persons and their inner world based upon Alice in Wonderland, and a remarkable series of hyper-realistic digital portraits called Dalla miniera ("From the mine"). One of the most interesting pictures in this series depicts Pasquale Montemurro, a former pupil and assistant to Terrile, while squeezing his own head between his hands in resignment or desperation, a feeling elicited using violent contrast on the scalp. As opposed to this, the model's look is somehow serene. Montemurro, at the time also a close friend of Terrile, died of cancer in 2010 at the age of 45, a few months after the picture was taken.

In recent times Terrile has also developed an interest in industrial architecture and abandoned buildings. Genoa, formerly a town of heavy industries and steel production now undergoing a somehow traumatic conversion, is a perfect location for this. The Cornigliano steel plant, recently shut down, and the Hennebique building, once a grain deposit of the harbour now home to junkies and tramps, are examples of this trend. In settings such as these Terrile and his pupils have portrayed a number of dressed up characters, creating an alienating semantic contrast.

Terrile is also very active in teaching and dissemination. Since 2000 he has held yearly basic- and advanced-level photography courses, usually transferring to the advanced level some of the pupils of the basic courses. The advanced courses have therefore kept on accumulating new people, knowledge and experience – Terrile usually employs his pupils in his own professional activity – so that they represent nowadays a small but active community of amateur photographers in Genoa. In 2007 Terrile founded a non-profit society called Percorsi magici ("Magic paths"), devoted to the organisation of the courses, as well as of exhibitions, lectures, conferences and workshops. Terrile's teaching style is reported to be extremely informal and non-technical but highly practical.

=== Nel segno dell'angelo ===
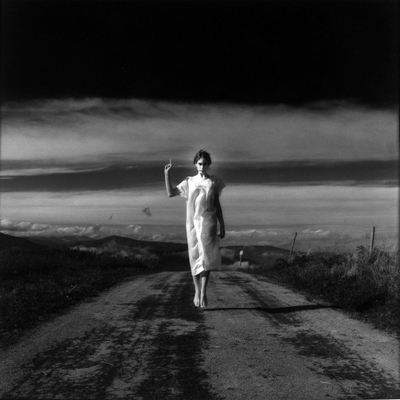
Angel No. 30 Francesca S., 1994

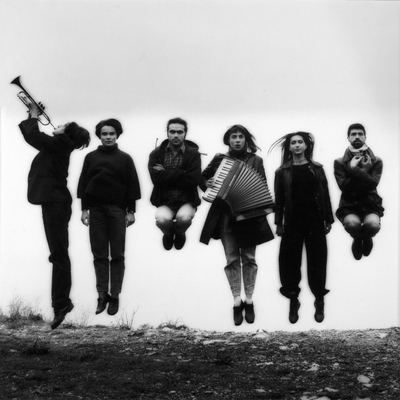
Angel No. 40 Arbalete, 1996

Terrile's angels are common men and women, alone, in couples or in groups. They can be surrounded by a threatening, dark sky or placed in a relaxed garden-like atmosphere. Stark contrast is usually employed to generate a sort of aura around the subject. The act of jumping is framed exactly at that peculiar moment when vertical velocity is nil, leaving the spectator with the illusion of a still frame, an impossible pose. (As a matter of fact, Terrile's angels look at first sight as carefully contrived photomontage.) Terrile's angels admittedly echo the imaginative world of Wim Wenders's Wings of desire ("Der Himmel über Berlin", 1987), in turn inspired by Rainer Maria Rilke's poems, and co-authored by Peter Handke.

Nel segno dell'angelo spawns more than three decades, the first attempts dating back to 1979 (the very pictures Fluttuare can be considered early angels) and is currently an ongoing work – on average, Terrile has been shooting one angel every year. Traces and critical reviews of this work are found in some of the major photography magazines around the world (see the section about critical evaluation) and the related pictures have appeared, altogether or in batches, in exhibitions in Berlin, Avignon, Genoa, Milan.

== Critical evaluation ==
=== Reviews ===
- J.P. Giovanelli, La vitesse de liberation d'Alberto Terrile ("AT's urge for liberation") in Fluxus, April 1996.
- Alberto Terrile: angeli ("AT: angels") in Photonews – Zeitung für Photographie, April 1997.
- Paolo Castelli, Polvere d'angeli ("Angel dust") in Rivista del cinematografo n.3, March 1997.
- Guido Festinese, Angeli giù dal paradiso ("Angels fallen from heaven") in Il manifesto, August 1998.
- Andrea Jacchia, A livello degli angeli ("At the level of angels") in Diario della settimana, 1998.
- Nedjima Van Egmond, Alberto Terrile place le Petit Palais sous le signe de l'ange ("AT puts the Petit Palais under the sign of the angel") in La Provence, 1998.
- Laure Bernard, La photographie des anges ("Photographing angels") in Le Figaro, July 1998.
- Flavio Brighenti, Gli angeli sono fra di noi ("Angels are among us") in Musica, 1998.
- Ferruccio Giromini in Blue nr. 89, 1998.
- David Crosby in Zoom nr. 27, July/August 1998.
- Roberta Ridolfi in Segno – Rivista di attualità internazionali d'arte contemporanea nr. 167, March/April 1999.
- Viana Conti, Alberto Terrile, il Buster Keaton della fotografia ("AT, the Buster Keaton of photography") in Frigidaire nr. 112, March 1990.
- Annissa Defilippi, Per favore non-chiamatelo il ritrattista degli angeli ("Please do not dub him the portrait photographer of angels") in Infonòpoli, 2009.

=== Awards ===
- 1989 Best Portrait of the Year awarded by Progresso fotografico
- 1994 Excellence Standard Kodak European Gold Award
- 1995 Excellence Standard Kodak European Gold Award

== Publications and exhibitions ==
=== Books ===
- 1998 Sous le signe de l'Ange, edited by Petit Palais Editions
- 2008 Poeti Immaginati, edited by La Lontra
- 2008 Nel Segno dell'Angelo 1991/2008, limited edition for the Science Festival of Genoa, Italy
- 2012 Sous le signe de l’Ange, Jacques Flament Editions

=== Personal exhibitions ===
- 1986 La morte piatta (The flat death) Psyco club, Genoa, Italy
- 1989 Immagini dell'interruzione del movimento (Images of movement breakdown) Church of Santa Maria di Castello, Genoa, Italy
- 1991 Il luogo del vero silenzio Teatro Verdi, Genoa, Italy
- 1992 Figure d'artista (Figures of artists) Portraits of contemporary Swiss artists (among which Daniel Spoerri, Ben Vautier, Christian Megert) within the exposition Frammenti, interfacce, intervalli, paradigmi della frammentazione nell'arte svizzera, Museo di architettura e scultura ligure, Genoa, Italy
- 1994 Rabelais le sixieme livre Centre Culturel Galliera, Genoa, Italy
- 1995 Rabelais le sixieme livre Palazzo Tursi, Genoa, Italy
- 1995 Rabelais le sixieme livre Railway station of Genova P. Principe, Genoa, Italy
- 1995 Paris 1992–1994 Centre Culturel Galliera, Genoa, Italy
- 1995 Angeli edited by Robert Jarmatz and Jolanda Darbyshire, PPS Galerie, Berlin, Germany
- 1998 Sous le signe de l'ange edited by Esther Moench, Musée du Petit Palais, Avignon, France
- 1998 Sous le signe de l'ange Galleria Bianca Pilat, Milan, Italy
- 2000 Ritratti (Portraits) edited by Paola Lambardi, Terrazza Silva Plando, Milan, Italy
- 2003 Ritratti/Cinema Teatro Cargo, Genoa, Italy
- 2004 Cinema Feltrinelli bookshop, Genoa, Italy
- 2004 Cinema (vol. 2) I tre Merli, Genoa, Italy
- 2006 Cinema Centro Polivalente Sivori, Genoa, Italy
- 2007 Ritratti di Alberto Terrile 93/94/97 (Portraits) Centro Polivalente Sivori, Genoa, Italy
- 2008 Poeti Immaginati (Imagined poets) Centro Polivalente Sivori, Genoa, Italy
- 2008 Nel Segno dell'Angelo (In the sign of the angel), within the Science Festival of Genoa, Italy
- 2013 Nel Segno dell'Angelo 1993/2013, within the European Photography Festival of Reggio Emilia, Italy
- 2016 Ma che occhi grandi che hai... (Parte I, 2012) (How big your eyes are... Part I, 2012), Museo dell'Accademia Ligustica, Genoa, Italy

=== Co-authored exhibitions ===
- 1986 Tra il dire e il fare (From saying to doing) Bagni comunali S.Nazaro, Genoa, Italy
- 1994 Equinozio d'autunno edited by Franz Paludetto, Castello di Rivara, Tutin, Italy
- 1995 Il viaggio in tutti i suoi aspetti (Travelling, every aspect of it) Fondazione G. Costa, Genoa, Italy; re-appeared in 1996 at the Galleria G. Costa, Genoa, Italy
- 1995 Colore aperto (Open colour) Loggia della Mercanzia, Genoa, Italy
- 1995 Red Ribbon Palazzo Tursi – Club amici del cinema – Le Corbusier, Genoa, Italy
- 1996 Oeuvres & Lectures edited by Gerard-Philippe Broutin & Roland Sabatier, Les Salons Art, Vidéo, Cinéma et Ecritures, Lavoir Moderne Parisien, Paris, France
- 1996 Atelier d'artista Casa di Giorgione, Castelfranco Veneto, Treviso, Italy
- 1996 Nel segno dell'angelo – Sign of an angel edited by Bianca Pilat, Bianca Pilat Contemporary art L.L.C., Chicago, USA
- 1997 The angel in Contemporary Art, Design and Advertising edited by Bianca Pilat, J.D. Carrier Art Gallery, Toronto, Canada
- 1997 Sous le signe de l'ange edited by Bianca Pilat, La Chapelle Historique du Bon-Pasteur, Montréal, Canada
- 1997 Il punto (The point) edited by Elio Grazioli, Galleria Continua, San Gimignano, Siena, Italy
- 1997 Oeuvres & Lectures/Salon Virtuel edited by Gerard-Philippe Broutin & Roland Sabatier, Paris, France
- 1998 Angeli su Roma (Angels over Rome) Chiesa di S.Rita, Rome, Italy
- 1999 Angeli su Roma Roof garden di Palazzo delle esposizioni, Roma, Italy
- 2000 Angeli e Angeli (Angels and angels) Oratorio Madonna della Neve, Chiavari, Genoa, Italy
- 2000 exposition celebrating the introduction of Riga due, edited by Marcos y Marcos, Galleria Estatic, Turin, Italy
- 2000 ditto, re-issued at Galleria Continua San Gimignano, Siena, Italy
- 2000 appeared at the Sacred Art three-yearly exposition Trascendenze e Spiritualità, edited by Raffaella Iannella, Celano, L'Aquila, Italy
- 2002 Fantascienza e Agrestità (Science-fiction and rurality) Il Campazzo, Modena, Italy
- 2003 Corpi Liberi Antico Palazzo della Pretura Castel Arquato, Piacenza, Italy
- 2003 Italialainen Tilanne II (Italian situation, 2) City gallery of Viitasaari, Finland
- 2003 Fantasmi (Ghosts) Il Campazzo-Guiglia, Modena, Italy
- 2003 L'Archivolto in Mostra stage pictures, Galleria Il Vicolo, Genoa, Italy
- 2003 Opere a 63° 05' N 25° 54' E & Opere a 44° 35' N 08° 18' E, a Finnish/Italian exposition, Liguria Spazio Aperto, Genoa, Italy
- 2004 FHARE Il Campazzo-Guiglia, Modena, Italy
- 2004-2005 Disegnare il marmo Carrara (Drawing on Carrara marble), Palazzo Binelli, Carrara, Italy
- 2007 Interrotti Transiti – La fotografia italiana negli anni settanta (Broken paths – Italian photography in the Seventies), Loggia della Mercanzia, Genoa, Italy
- 2009 Lettere (Letters), Biblioteca Berio, Genoa, Italy
- 2010 I grandi fotografi per i bambini (Great photographers for children) Museo di S. Agostino, Genoa, Italy
- 2011 La femminilità è donna (Womanhood is woman) Museo di S. Giulia, Brescia, Italy
- 2011 Viaggio visionario nella memoria delle Ex Officine comunali (A visionary voyage in the memories of former City Factories) Ex officine comunali, Genoa, Italy
- 2012 Un'idea di teatro / Un teatro di idee (An idea of theatre / A theatre of ideas) edited by Giorgio Gallione. Palazzo Ducale, Genoa, Italy
- 2015 Accademia Italia Museo dell'Accademia Ligustica, Genoa, Italy
