= Maura Fabbri =

Italian footballer

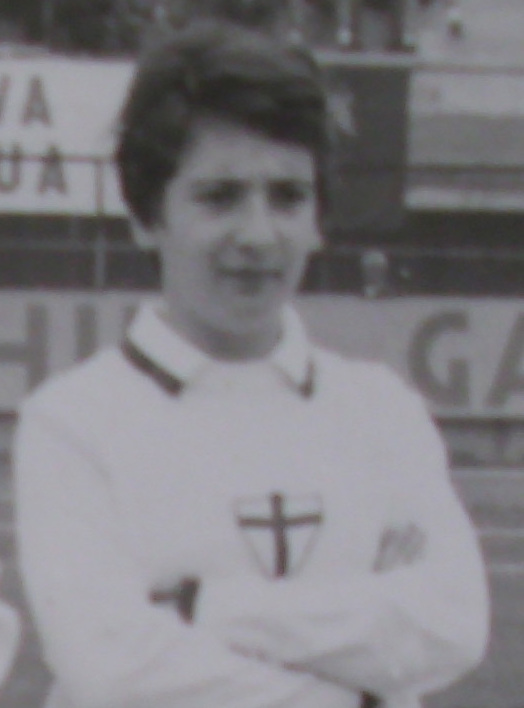

Personal information
- Date of birth: 2 November 1951 (age 75)
- Place of birth: Genoa, Italy

Senior career*
Years	Team	Apps	(Gls)
1968-1970	Genoa		
1971	Piacenza Associazione Calcio Femminile		

International career
1968-1974	Italy	23	(5)
- * Club domestic league appearances and goals

Maura Fabbri (born 2 November 1951) is an Italian former professional footballer who played as a midfielder for Genoa.

== Honours ==
=== International ===
Italy

- 1969 European Competition for Women's Football
