= Mulugeta Abate =

- Birth name: Mulugeta Abate
- Born: Ethiopia
- Origin: Ethiopia
- Occupation: Musician & entertainer

Mulugeta Abate was an Ethiopian songwriter, arranger, and lyricist popular for his prolific work on about 400 different albums and more than 4000 songs in various languages of Ethiopia. His latest works include the album by Man Alemosoh, which featured a popular song, "Wello". He was also credited for albums by dozens of singers in the Oromo language including the pop star Saiha Sami, and Desaligne Mersah in the Gurage language. He also arranged the popular Amharic song "ሕልሜን የት ልክሰሰው" sung by Gosaye Tesfye.

Mulugeta Abate was born in Kombolcha, Wollo, Ethiopia. He was also known by another name, Roobaa Dhaabaa (Oromo name). In his latest interview with Ethiopian Broadcasting Corporation/EBC3, Mulugeta explained that the name Roobaa Dhaabaa was given to him by Oromos as a reward for his wonderful contribution in the development of Oromo song industry.

In Ethiopia, the vocalist receives most of the credit for the songs he or she performs, while the lyricist and melodist are often not credited, or barely mentioned, and are generally unrecognized by the public. Thus, most Ethiopians do not know the authors of songs, as in the case of Mulugeta Abate. He died in November 2016.
