= Abatement of debts and legacies =

Common law doctrine of wills

Abatement of debts and legacies is a common law doctrine of wills that holds that when the equitable assets of a deceased person are not sufficient to satisfy fully all the creditors, their debts must abate proportionately, and they must accept a dividend.

Also, in the case of legacies when the funds or assets out of which they are payable are not sufficient to pay them in full, the legacies abate in proportion, unless there is a priority given specially to any particular legacy. Annuities are also subject to the same rule as general legacies.

The order of abatement is usually:

1. Intestate property
2. The residuary of the estate
3. General Devises—i.e., cash gifts
4. Demonstrative Devises—i.e., cash gifts from a specific account, stocks, bonds, securities, etc.
5. Specific Devises—i.e., specified items of personal property, real property, etc.

Non-probate property—i.e., life insurance policies—do not abate.

== Definitions ==
A specific devise, is a specific gift in a will to a specific person other than an amount of money. For example, if James's will states that he is leaving his $500,000 yacht to his brother Mike, the yacht would be a specific devise.

A general devise, is a monetary gift to a specific person to be satisfied out of the overall estate. For example, if James's will states that he is leaving $500,000 to his son Sam then the money would be a general devise.

A demonstrative devise, is money given from a particular account. For example, "$10,000 to be paid from the sale of my GM stock."

A residual devise is one left to a devisee after all specific and general devices have been made. For example, James's will might say: "I give all the rest, residue and remainder of my estate to my daughter Lilly." Lilly would be the residual devisee and entitled to James's residuary estate.
