= Entrainment (physical geography) =

In physical geography, entrainment is the process by which surface sediment is incorporated into a fluid flow (such as air, water or even ice) as part of the operation of erosion.
