= Enrico Accatino =

Italian painter (1920–2007)

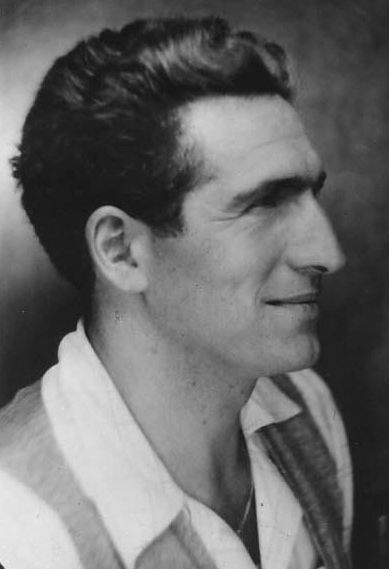
Enrico Accatino, photo, 1945, 25 years old

Enrico Accatino (August 20, 1920 – July 16, 2007) was an Italian abstract painter, sculptor, designer, and advocate of a new Italian culture tied to textiles. He was awarded a gold medal by the President of the Italian Republic for "Benemerito della Scuola, della Cultura e dell'Arte".

== Early years and education ==
Enrico Accatino was born in the city of Genova in 1920 into a farming family. He studied drawing in Turin from 1938 to 1940 with Felice Casorati. Mobilized in the declaration of war, Accatino was assigned to an artillery regiment at Manduria, in southern Italy. At the end of the war, graduated from the Rome Fine Arts Academy, he moved to Paris, where he mixed with artists such as Matisse, Severini, Giacometti, and Manessier. He developed a figurative style inspired by social themes, reflecting the influence of his friend Renato Guttuso.

== Life and work ==
Aniconic paintings and collages were created in the second half of the 1950s, when he started to investigate circularity (circles, disks, ellipses) and Arte Informale style. From 1966 Accatino was intensely dedicated to the re-launching of textile arts as language, creating bi- and tri-dimensional solutions such his double faced diaphragm tapestries (plastic elements suspended in space).

Accatino's works can be found in the permanent collections of several museums around the world, and during his long and intense artistic career he attained important national and international recognition. He created a prolific amount of graphic work with abstract motifs.

From 1960 to 1964 he was responsible for the planning of a new method of teaching art, through hundreds of television transmissions (RAI - Radio Televisione Italiana). He also published important texts on Visual Arts and the History of Art.

He died in 2007 in Rome.

His works are in museums and private collections including Galleria Nazionale d'Arte Moderna of Rome, Permanent Collection of Modern Art of Vatican Museums, Foundation Simon Wiesenthal of Los Angeles, Museum of Contemporary Sculpture of Matera.

== Bibliography ==
- Madeileine Jarry. La Tapisserie art du XX siecle, Office du Livre Paris, 1974
- Giorgio di Genova. Enrico Accatino - La circolarità dello Spirito, Istituto Grafico Editoriale - Roma, 1991
- Francesca Franco. Enrico Accatino - Dal realimo all'astrazione alla sintesi delle arti, Introduzione di Giuseppe Appella—De Luca Editore, Roma, 2005
