= Giovanni Battista Tassara =

Italian sculptor

Giovanni Battista Tassara (Genoa, June 23, 1841 - Genoa, October 5, 1916) was an Italian sculptor.

As a young man he was apprenticed in the studio of the professor Nomagnino, where he stayed 6 or 7 months, transferring to the studio of professor Giovanni Battista Cevasco. By 1860, Tassara joined the patriotic Expedition of the Thousand, and distinguished himself for valor. At Calatafimi, he was made corporal, and in Palermo sergeant, receiving two honorable mentions and an honor for a wound to the right shoulder that damaged part of his scapula.

One of his first works was a group of three figures: La morte di Schiaffino porta bandiera dei Mille a Calatafimi; the sculptural group Amori degli Angioli: a statue of Garibaldi sullo scoglio di Quarto; and a group depicting: The Baptism of Christ, now in the church of Santa Margherita Ligure; The Dream of a Virgin; and Una coppa, exhibited in Florence in 1871.

Tassara completed many portrait busts of illustrious persons, among those of professors Ussi, Conti, Ongaro, Massimo D'Azeglio, Aleardi, and others. He was criticized for being to prolific. Among his other works, was a larger than life Moses for the Cemetery of Staglieno in Genoa; and a monument to Bellini for the Duomo of Catania. Tassara sculpted two statues, Aaron and Samuel, for the new facade of the Cathedral of Florence. In 1880, the House of Savoy commissioned from him a large statue of Neptune. He then moved to in Rome. He completed two large bas-reliefs, for the Ossuary of Calatafimi. Tassara, among his many honors, was nominated in 1867 honorary associate of the Accademia Raffaello of Urbino; in 1868, professor at the Academy of Fine Arts of Florence, and the next year of the Academy of Genoa. In 1883, he attempted to establish a factory for maiolica, but the business failed.
