= Abbati =

Abbati is an Italian surname. Notable people with the surname include:

- Armanda Degli Abbati (1879–1946), Italian opera singer
- Giuseppe Abbati (1836–1868), Italian artist
- Pietro Abbati Marescotti (1768–1842), Italian mathematician
- Pietro Giovanni Abbati (1683–1745), Italian set designer, painter, and engraver
- Stefano Abbati (born 1955), Italian actor
- Vincenzo Abbati (1803–1874?), Italian painter

== See also ==
- Abatis, a type of field fortification
