= Giovanni Stefano Maia =

Italian painter (1672–1747)

Giovanni Stefano Maia (1672–1747) was an Italian painter of the late Baroque period, active in Genoa and Naples.

== Biography ==
Born and trained in Genoa, he was forced to flee Genoa after participating in a brawl. He moved to Rome and Naples, where he worked under Francesco Solimena. He returned to his native country only in 1727, but was impoverished for commissions since his skill as a portrait artists was not well known.
