= Julio Abatte =

Argentine footballer

Personal information
- Full name: Julio César Abatte
- Position: Midfielder

Senior career*
Years	Team	Apps	(Gls)
1946–1948	Bádminton		
1949	Universidad de Chile	13	(9)
1950–1952	Ferrobádminton		
1953–1954	Rangers		(20)
- * Club domestic league appearances and goals

Julio César Abatte was an Argentine footballer who played as a midfielder for clubs in Chile. He was born in Mendoza.

== Career ==
Abatte played for Bádminton, Universidad de Chile, Ferrobádminton and Rangers de Talca.

Abatte was a key figure in Rangers de Talca's squad as they turned professional and achieved promotion to the Chilean top division. He scored a goal in the club's Chilean Primera División debut as Rangers won 4–3 against Universidad Católica in May 1953. He spent two seasons with Rangers and scored 20 goals in total.

=== Teams ===
- (Chile) Bádminton 1946–1948
- Universidad de Chile 1949
- (Chile) Ferrobádminton 1950–1952
- (Chile) Rangers 1952–1953

== Personal life ==
His son, Juan Carlos, nicknamed Conejo (Rabbit), also was a historical player of Rangers between 1973 and 1976.

Julio was nicknamed Rucio, a distortion of Rubio (Blond).
