= Ezio Borgo =

Italian footballer

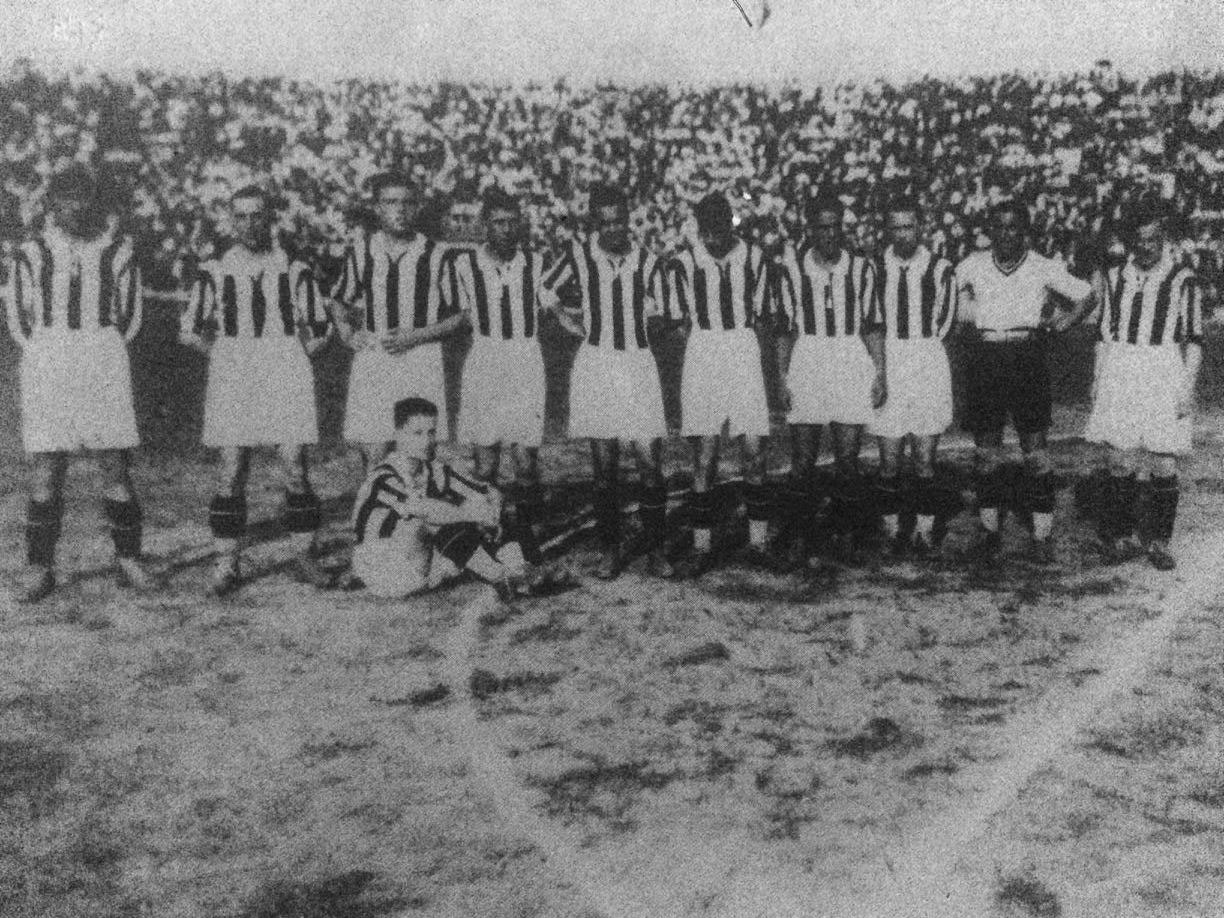

Personal information
- Date of birth: 20 November 1907
- Place of birth: Genoa, Kingdom of Italy
- Position: Midfielder

Senior career*
Years	Team	Apps	(Gls)
1927–1930	Juventus	20	(0)
1930–1931	Casale	11	(2)
1931–1933	Messina	28	(8)
1933–1934	Intra		
1935–1937	Grosseto	43	(30)
- * Club domestic league appearances and goals

Ezio Borgo (born 20 November 1907) was an Italian professional football player. He was born in Genoa.

His older brother, Guglielmo Borgo, also played football professionally. To distinguish them, Guglielmo was known as Borgo I and Ezio as Borgo II.
