= Carlo Abbate =

Italian composer

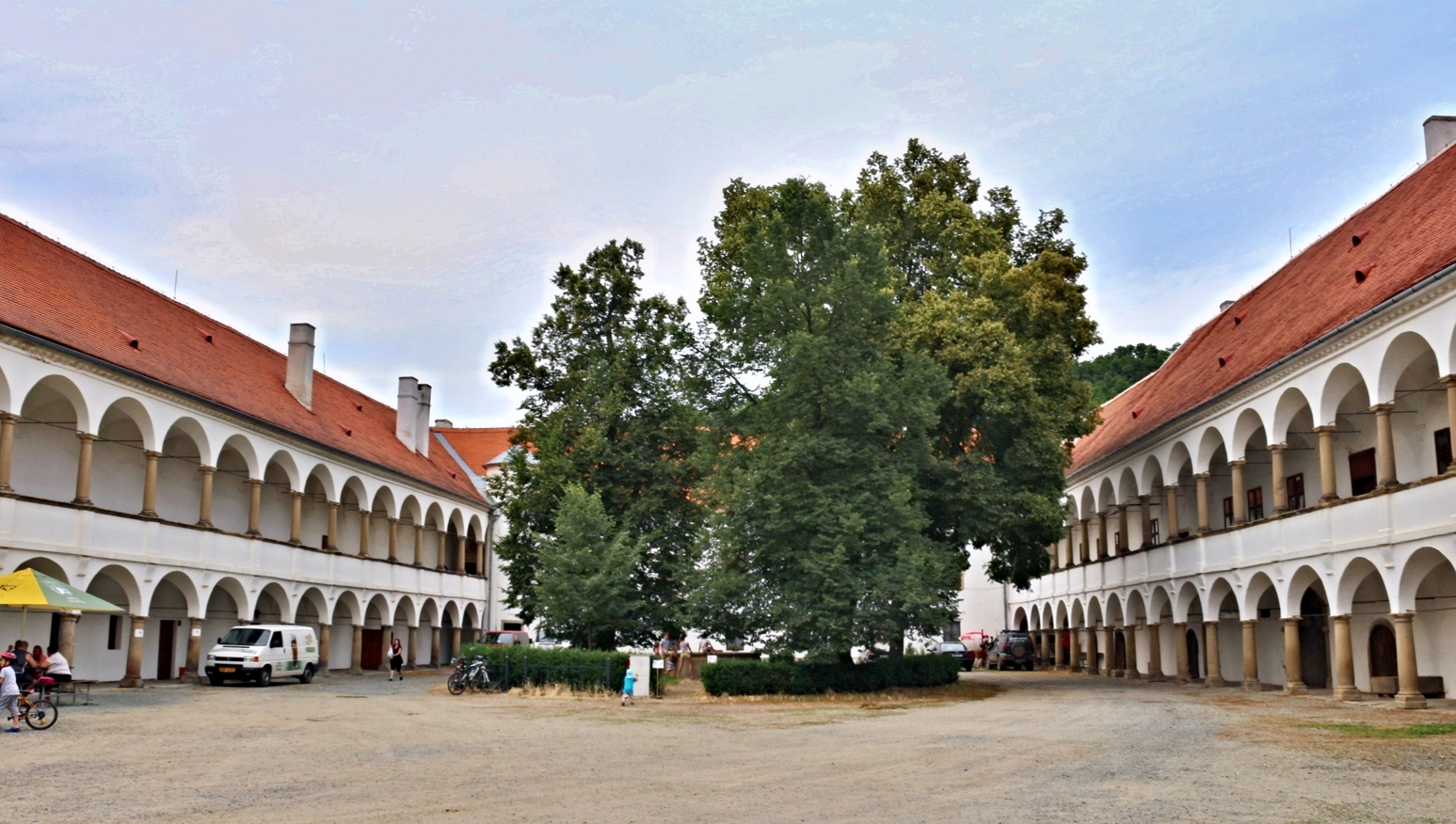
Chateau Oslavany, today South Moravian Region in the Czech Republic

Carlo Abbate (c. 1600 – before 1640) was an Italian music theorist, composer, and Franciscan priest. Born in Genoa, he served as chaplain and musician to Cardinal Franz von Dietrichstein, Prince-Bishop of Olomouc, and governor of Moravia.

Before 1629, he taught music at the Seminary at Oslavany convent; afterwards, he taught at the newly established Loretan Seminary at Nikolsburg, which was the cardinal's principal residence. When Abbate returned to Italy in 1632, he published his treatise, Regulae contrapuncti excerptae ex operibus Zerlini et aliorum ad breviorem tyronum instructionem accommodate, which was intended to be used as a textbook for his seminarians. The treatise mainly consists of already established rules regarding consonance and dissonance. The book was adapted from the works of Gioseffo Zarlino.

== Bibliography ==
- Bohn, Emil (1890). Die Musikalischen Handschriften des 16 und 17. Breslau: Georg Olms
- Grove, George (1980). The New Grove Dictionary of Music and Musicians. London: Macmillan Publishers. Seite 4. ISBN 9781561591749
