= German Antarctic North Victoria Land Expeditions =

The German Antarctic North Victoria Land Expeditions, usually referred to by the acronym GANOVEX with an appended Roman numeral to identify a particular expedition, are a series of largely ship-based geoscientific expeditions, mainly to northern Victoria Land in Antarctica, though some work has been carried out at other Antarctic locations. The expeditions are sponsored by the Bundesanstalt für Geowissenschaften und Rohstoffe (BGR – the German Federal Institute for Geosciences and Natural Resources) in conjunction and cooperation with government agencies and academic institutions in Germany and elsewhere.

Originally work focussed on reconstructing the Gondwanan breakup and relationships between Antarctica, Australia and the micro-continents of Tasmania and New Zealand. Subsequent research includes the geodynamics of the Paleozoic, 500 million year old, Ross Orogen on the edge of the Paleopacific Ocean, and the genesis of the Cenozoic continental Ross Sea Rift and the uplift of its western flank in the area of the Transantarctic Mountains.

== Expeditions ==
The first expedition (GANOVEX I) took place in 1979–1980. The second (GANOVEX II) took place in 1981–1982 but was aborted following the sinking of its supply ship Gotland II. Subsequent expeditions were:

- III – 1982–1983 – North Victoria Land
- IV – 1984–1985 – North Victoria Land
- V – 1988–1989 – North Victoria Land, Oates Coast
- VI – 1990–1991 – North Victoria Land
- VII – 1992–1993 – Victoria Land, Oates Coast, Marie Byrd Land
- VIII – 1999–2000 – Victoria Land, Oates Coast, George V Land
- IX – 2005–2006 – North Victoria Land
- X – 2009–2010 – North Victoria Land
- XI – 2015–2016 – North Victoria Land
