= Mario Ventimiglia =

Italian footballer, manager, and chairman

Personal information
- Date of birth: March 7, 1921
- Place of birth: Sanremo, Italy
- Date of death: 2005
- Place of death: Sanremo, Italy
- Position: Midfielder

Senior career*
Years	Team	Apps	(Gls)
1938–1942	Sanremese		
1942–1943	Juventus	13	(3)
1943–1944	Liguria	15	(10)
1945–1946	Sampierdarenese	15	(1)
1946–1949	Sanremese		
1949–1952	Savona	79	(19)
1952–1956	Sanremese	41	(7)
1956–1957	Savona	7	(2)
- * Club domestic league appearances and goals

Mario Ventimiglia (7 March 1921 – 6 June 2005) was an Italian professional football player, manager and chairman.
