= Channel pattern =

Characteristic geometry of a channel system

Channel patterns are found in rivers, streams, and other bodies of water that transport water from one place to another. Systems of branching river channels dissect most of the sub-aerial landscape, each in a valley proportioned to its size. Whether formed by chance or necessity, by headward erosion or downslope convergence, whether inherited or newly formed. Depending on different geological factors such as weathering, erosion, depositional environment, and sediment type, different types of channel patterns can form.

== Bedrock vs. alluvial channels ==
There are two main types of channels, bedrock and alluvial, which are present no matter the sub-classification. Bedrock channels are composed entirely of compacted rock, with only patches of alluvium scattered throughout. Because the bedrock is constantly exposed it takes much less stream power to carve the channel. The hydraulic force of flowing water can push and pull detached joint blocks out of their initial position and roll or drag them downstream. Plucking is common in jointed rocks, where this occurs.

Alluvial channels are much more common and can be large or small. All large rivers, and most small ones, have channels that are usually lined with alluvium, sediment that was carried to that channel reach by the river and that eventually will be carried farther downstream. This lining of alluvium creates a protective shield over the bedrock, which means it takes a much greater stream power to carve the channel.

== Braided channels ==
There are a few distinctly different channel types based on their geological structure and depositional environment. Braided rivers carry fairly coarse-grained sediment down a fairly steep gradient. They typically exhibit numerous channels that split off and rejoin each other to give a braided appearance. Additionally, the water discharge tends to be highly variable. Consequently, braided rivers usually exist near mountainous regions, especially those with glaciers. These braided channels usually occur in tectonically active environments and have a larger sediment load due to varying water flow and discharge.

== Anastomosed channels ==
Often confused with braided channels, anastomosing is reserved for a type of river with multiple, interconnected, coexisting channel belts on alluvial plains. Based on its geomorphology, saucer-shaped islands called flood-basins characterize anastomosing rivers. These channels are classified as a composite form of which the individual channel belts may have braided, meandering or straight channels. Although similar to, and even encompass other channel types, anastomosed rivers are their own entity and have just begun to be studied by geologists, revealing that much is still unknown.

Fluvial processes form several channel patterns, including:

- Straight, which are found in the most tectonically incised/active areas. This is more of a hypothetical end-member, and are not often found in nature. Straight-type channels can be found at alluvial fans.
- Braided rivers, which form in (tectonically active) areas that have a larger sedimentary load than the discharge of the river and a high gradient.
- Meandering rivers, which form a sinuous path in a usually low-gradient plain toward the end of a fluvial system.
- Anastomosed river is a rare case of a relatively straight, complicated vertical sequence of river deposits with banks held together by dense vegetation.

== See also ==
- Channel types
- Depositional environment – Processes associated with the deposition of a particular type of sediment
- Drainage system (geomorphology) – Patterns formed by streams, rivers, and lakes in a drainage system
- Fluvial landforms
- Fluvial processes – Sediment processes associated with rivers and streams
- Sedimentary structures – Geologic structures formed during sediment deposition
