= Lilly ARBOR Project =

Urban ecosystem restoration project in Indiana, US

Coordinates: 39°46′43.30″N 86°11′20.71″W

The Lilly ARBOR Project is a part of an experimental riparian floodplain reforestation and ecological restoration program, located along the White River in Indianapolis, Indiana, United States. ARBOR is an acronym for "Answers for Restoring the Bank Of the River".

== Project ==
The riparian forest restoration project was performed by the Center of Earth and Environmental Science (CEES) at Indiana University–Purdue University Indianapolis (IUPUI) with support from the Lilly Endowment.

As part of the riparian zone restoration project, nearly 1,400 trees were planted along the eastern bank of the White River near downtown Indianapolis. The eight-acre (3.2 ha) project site stretches for about one mile (1.6 km) from 10th St. (north) to New York St. (south). The initial planting occurred in the fall of 1999 and the spring of 2000.

After five years, the Lilly Arbor Project provided data on riparian zone reforestation strategies, which will be used in further research and future projects. Students and faculty from various universities conduct research and maintain the restoration using the CEES service learning program.

== Species ==
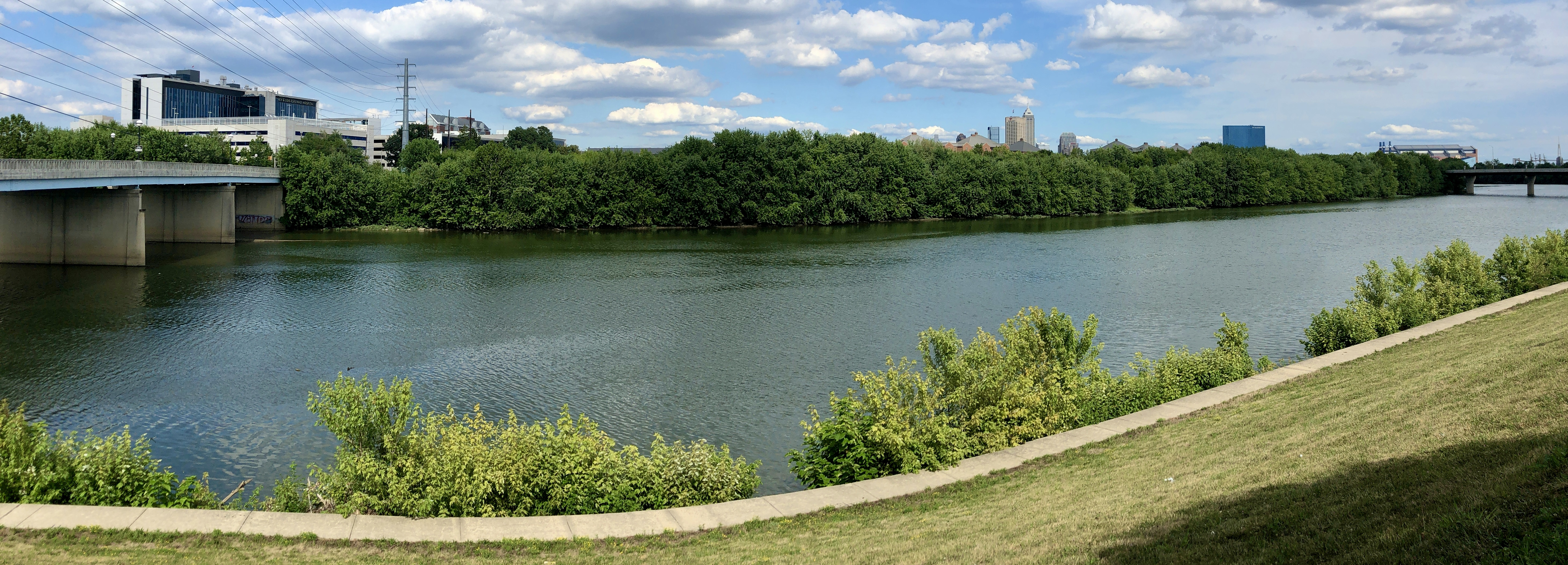
A segment of the Lilly ARBOR Project site in 2022 (between Michigan St. and New York St.)

A total of 1,332 trees belonging to one of twelve native species were planted across the project site, including:

Scientific name	Common name
Acer rubrum	Red maple
Acer saccharinum	Silver maple
Aesculus glabra	Ohio buckeye
Celtis occidentalis	Hackberry
Crataegus	Hawthorn
Fraxinus pennsylvanica	Green ash
Gleditsia triacanthos	Honey locust
Platanus occidentalis	American sycamore
Populus deltoides	Eastern cottonwood
Quercus bicolor	Swamp white oak
Quercus muehlenbergii	Chinquapin oak
Salix nigra	Black willow
Source: Indiana University Center for Earth and Environmental Science

Since the initial plantings in 1999 and 2000, additional native and invasive tree species have become established at the site. These include American elm (Ulmus americana), box elder (Acer negundo), Callery pear (Pyrus calleryana), Catalpa, dogwood (Cornus), goldenrain tree (Koelreuteria paniculata), red mulberry (Morus rubra), white mulberry (Morus alba), and Siberian elm (Ulmus pumila).

== See also ==
- Ecological restoration
- Buffer strip
- Riparian buffer
- Erosion control
- Riparian zone restoration
- Stream restoration
- Riparian terminology
- Biodiversity
- Conservation biology
- Global warming
- Habitat
- Habitat conservation
- Natural environment
- Plant community
