= Bird bath =

Artificial puddle or small shallow pond where birds bathe

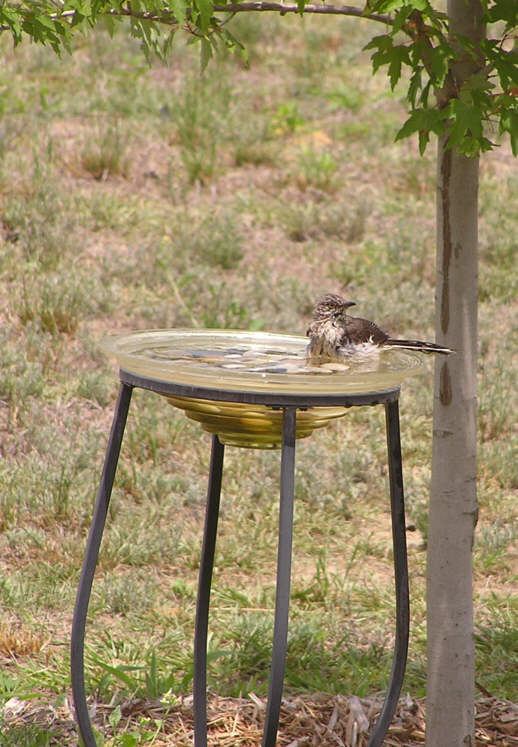
A watchful mockingbird bathing in a glass bowl bird bath.

A bird bath (or birdbath) is an artificial puddle or small shallow pond, created with a water-filled basin, in which birds may drink, bathe, and cool themselves. A bird bath can be a garden ornament, small reflecting pool, outdoor sculpture, and also can be a part of creating a vital wildlife garden.

== Description ==
A bird bath (or birdbath) is an artificial puddle or small shallow pond, created with a water-filled basin. Birds may use the bath to drink, bathe, and cool themselves. A bird bath is an attraction for many different species of birds to visit gardens, especially during the summer and drought periods. Bird baths that provide a reliable source of water year round add to the popularity and "micro-habitat" support.

Bird baths can be pre-made basins on pedestals and columns or hang from leaves and trees, or be carved out depressions in rocks and boulders. Requirements for a bird bath should include the following; a shallow gradually deepening basin; open surroundings to minimize cats' stalking; clean and renewed-refilled water; and cleaning to avoid contamination and mosquitoes. Two inches of water in the center is sufficient for most backyard birds, because they do not submerge their bodies, only dipping their wings to splash water on their backs. Deeper or wide basins can have "perch islands" in the water, which can also help discourage feline predators. Elevation on a pedestal is a common safety measure, providing a clear area around the bird bath that is free of hiding locations for predators. A bird feeder can complement a bird bath to encourage birds to linger and return.

The early bird baths were simple depressions in the ground. The first purpose-built bird bath was developed by UK garden design company, Abraham Pulman & Sons in the 1830s.

== Design and construction ==
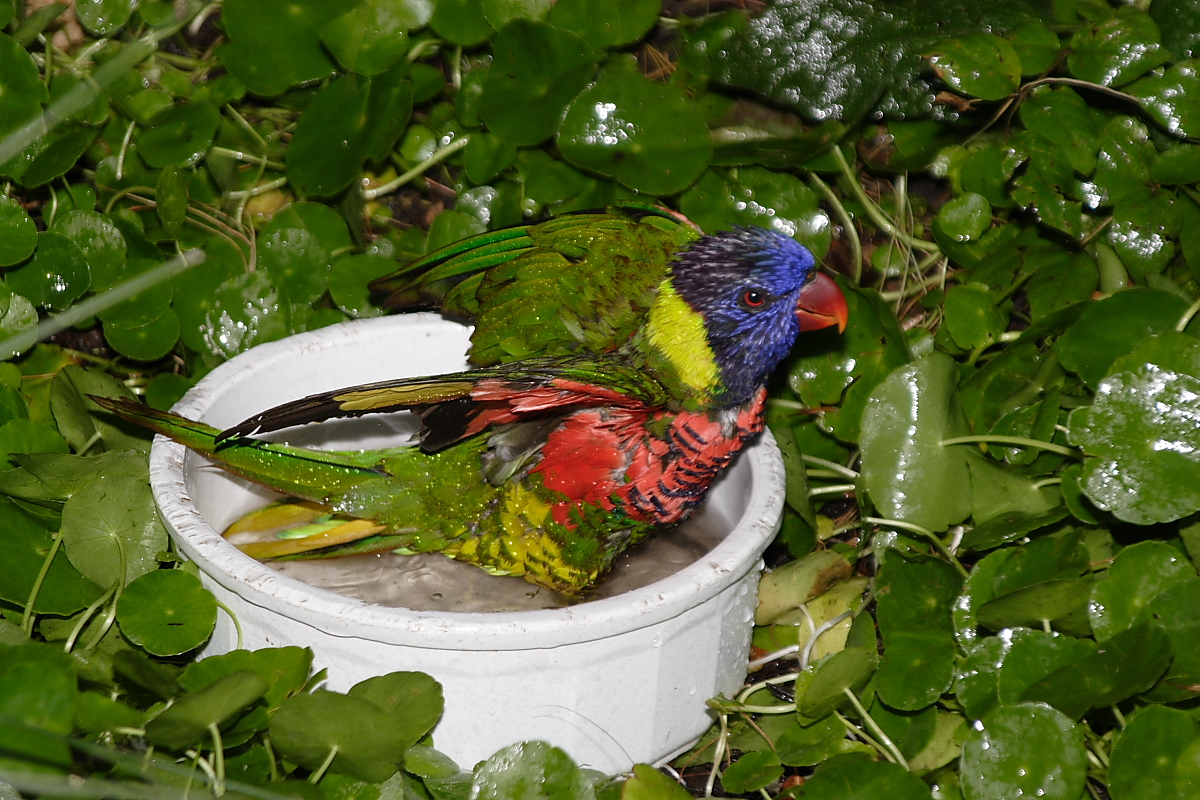
Lorikeet-sized bird bath displayed for close viewing inside a children's zoo

A bird bath can be a garden ornament, small reflecting pool, outdoor sculpture, and also can be a part of creating a vital wildlife garden. Bird baths can be made with materials, including molded concrete, glazed terra cotta, glass, metals (e.g., copper), plastics, mosaic tiles, marble, or any other material that can be outdoors and hold water. In natural landscape gardens rocks and boulders with natural or stonemason carved basins can fit in unobtrusively. Some bird baths use a recirculating pump as part of a fountain or water feature, and can include filters, a float valve-water connection for automatic refilling, or a drip irrigation emitter aimed into the bowl. Some use a solar powered pump, floating or submerged, to recirculate the water. Birds are attracted to the sight and sound of running water, with integrated or nearby fountains helpful elements to bring birds to the garden.

=== Ornaments and sculptures ===
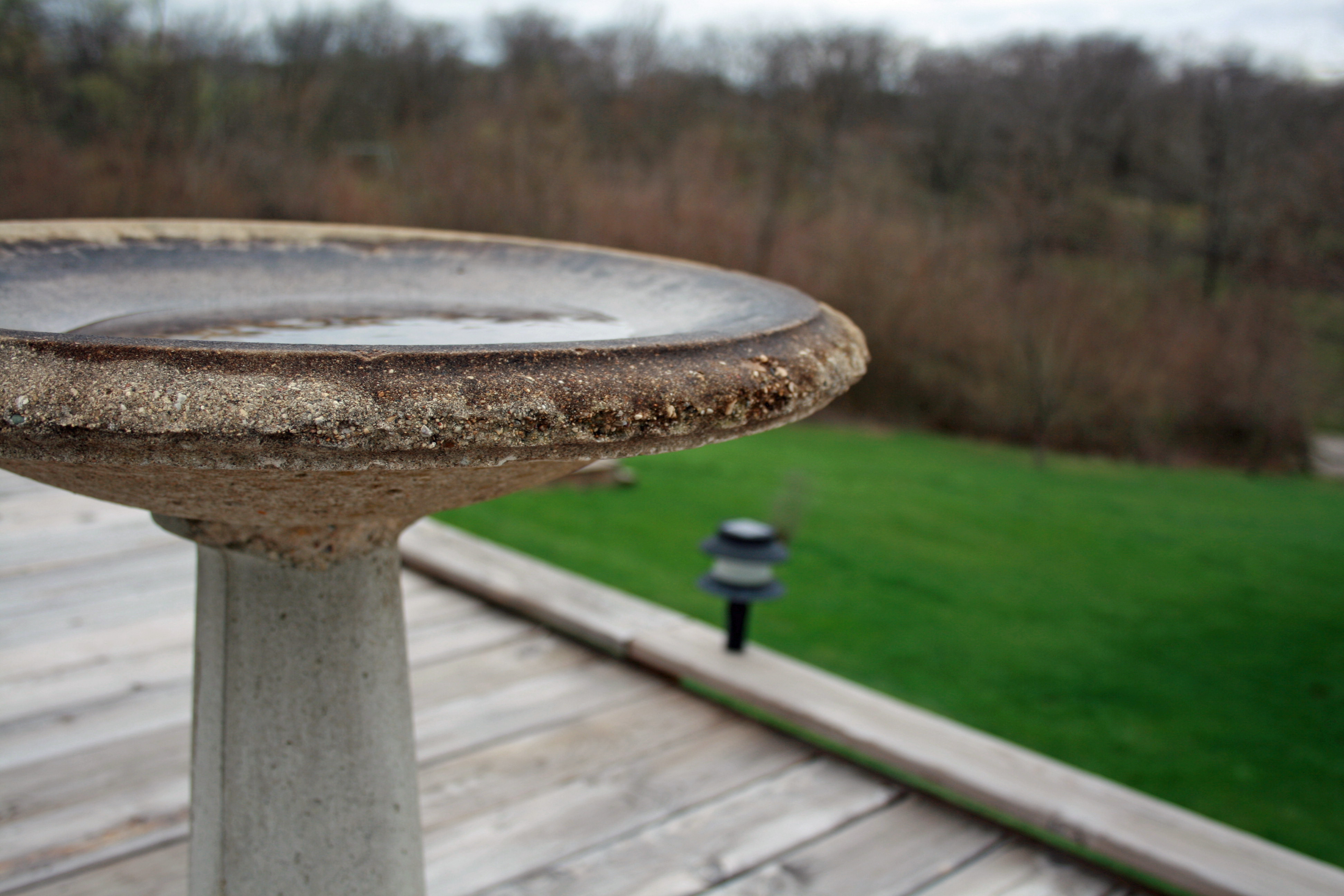
A shallow concrete bird bath

The traditional bird bath is made of molded concrete or glazed terra cotta formed in two pieces: the bowl and the pedestal. The bowl has an indentation or socket in the base which allows it to fit on the pedestal. The pedestal is typically about one meter tall. Both bowl and pedestal can be clean or decorated with bas-relief. Bowls can be pure curved geometry, or have motifs of a shell or pseudo-rocky spring. The pedestal can also be a simple silhouette or incorporate decorations. Birds seem unconcerned with the aesthetics, with even a shallow plate, pie-tin, or puddle below a slowly dripping water outlet used.

=== Baths for large birds ===
Large birds, such as the Canada goose, also enjoy baths. They may be accommodated well by large agricultural sprinklers in a field of stubble. Providing such a place for migratory birds, especially in urban and suburban areas devoid of wetlands is an excellent way of encouraging them to frequent an area.

== Bird habitat ==
=== Perch and view needs ===
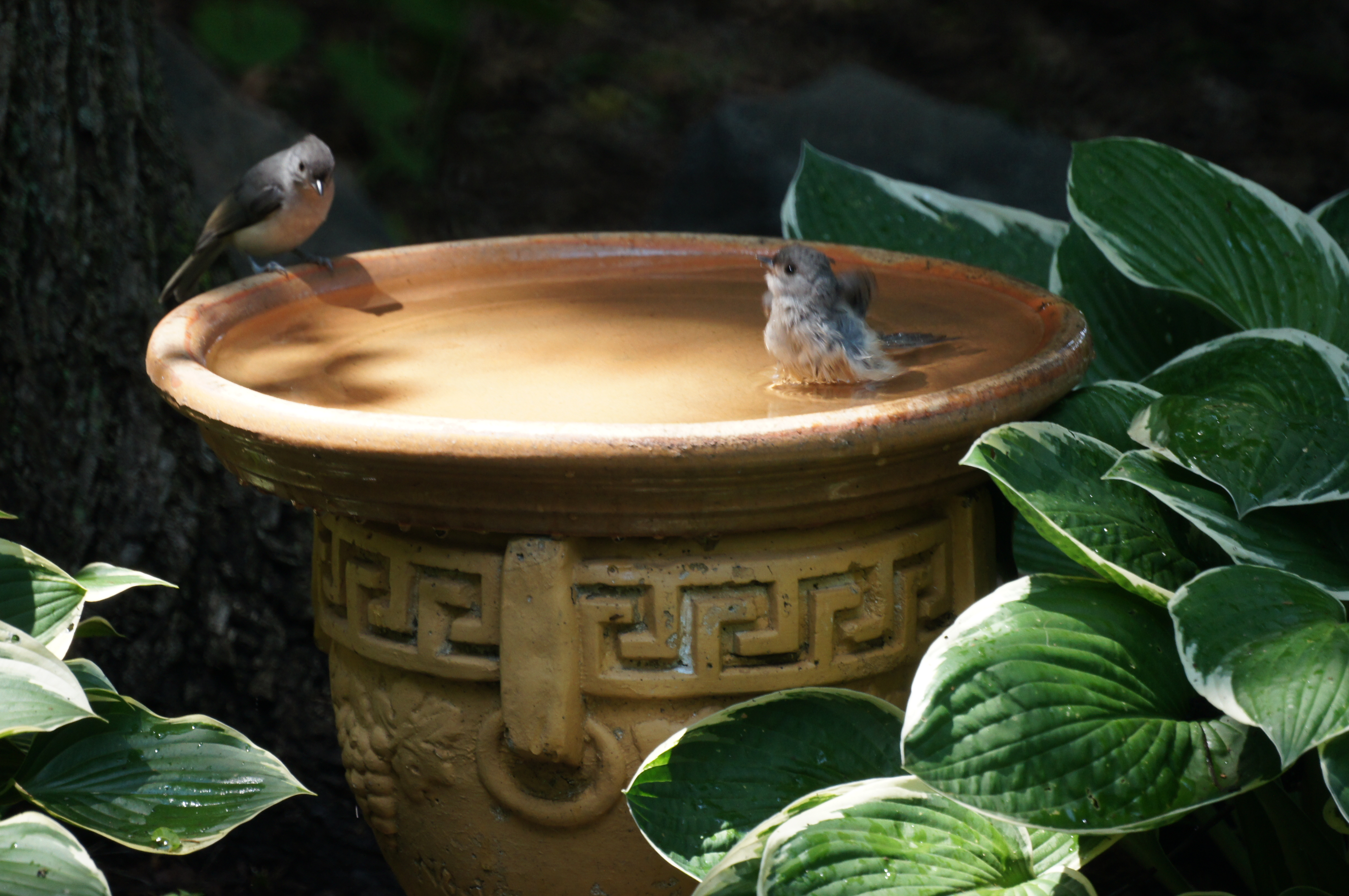
Two titmice in a shallow bird bath

Bird baths require a place for birds to perch. The bath should also be shallow enough to avoid the risk of birds drowning. A depth of 2” is right for most species. This requirement may be fulfilled by making the bowl shallow enough to allow birds to perch in the water. For deeper bowls, stones, gravel or rocks can be placed in the center to give birds a place to perch. Objects placed in the bird bath bowl should have a texture that makes it easy for birds' talons to hold. Birds lacking binocular vision have poor depth perception, and can find a bird bath off-putting if they are unable to judge the water's depth. Leaning a stick or flat rock against the bird bath rim as a ramp to allow them gradual access into the water may allay their fear.

Consideration should also be made to the issue of house cats and other predators, by placing the bird bath in a location where birds can see the area around it, and where there are no hiding places for predators. Birds cannot fly well when their feathers are wet; two feet of open space on all sides of the bird bath allows birds to see danger coming with enough time to escape. If the bowl is too deep, some birds will be afraid to enter the bath, staying at the edge and using it for drinking water only, being unable to see beyond the edge if entering the water, or unwilling to enter water that is too deep for their safety.

=== Plants ===
Native plants, ornamental plants that supply berries, acorns, nuts, seeds, nectar, and other foods, and also bird nest building materials encourage the health and new generations of birds. These qualities can also increase the visible population to enjoy in a garden. Using companion planting and the birds' insect cuisine habits is a traditional method for pest control in an organic garden, and any landscape.

Taller shrubs and trees nearby allow short and safe "commutes" to the bird bath. The bird bath will attract more birds if placed where a frightened bird can fly up easily to an overhanging limb or resting place if disturbed or attacked.

== Maintenance ==
A bird bath requires regular maintenance and fresh water. Fresh water and cleaning are important because of the possible adverse health effects of birds drinking dirty water, or water which may have become fouled with excrement, mosquito larvae, algae, or fungi.

Maintenance for some bird baths may be as simple as a wash and refill several times a week, but it will depend on the bird bath materials. There are a variety of methods and substances that can be used to clean a bird bath, including small quantities of bleach, oregano or olive oil, or commercially available, non-toxic cleaning products. Concrete bird baths tend to become mossy and, therefore, slippery—requiring an occasional scrubbing out with a stiff brush. Plastic or resin bird baths may need to be drained, wiped down with a towel, and refilled.

Mosquitoes and mosquito larvae are the most serious potential health risk that can be caused by poor bird bath maintenance. To prevent mosquito larvae, change the bird bath water weekly to interrupt their 7–10 day breeding cycle, or use a water aerator to break up the still water surface that mosquitoes require to lay eggs. Commercial products that contain bacillus thuringiensis israelensis (Bti), which is lethal to mosquitoes but non-toxic for humans and wildlife, can also be used to control mosquitoes.

== See also ==
- Bird feeder
- Bird watching
- Conservation biology
- Drought
- Gardens
- Habitats
- Mud-puddling
- Riparian zone restoration
- Wetlands
