= Channel (geography) =

Narrow body of water

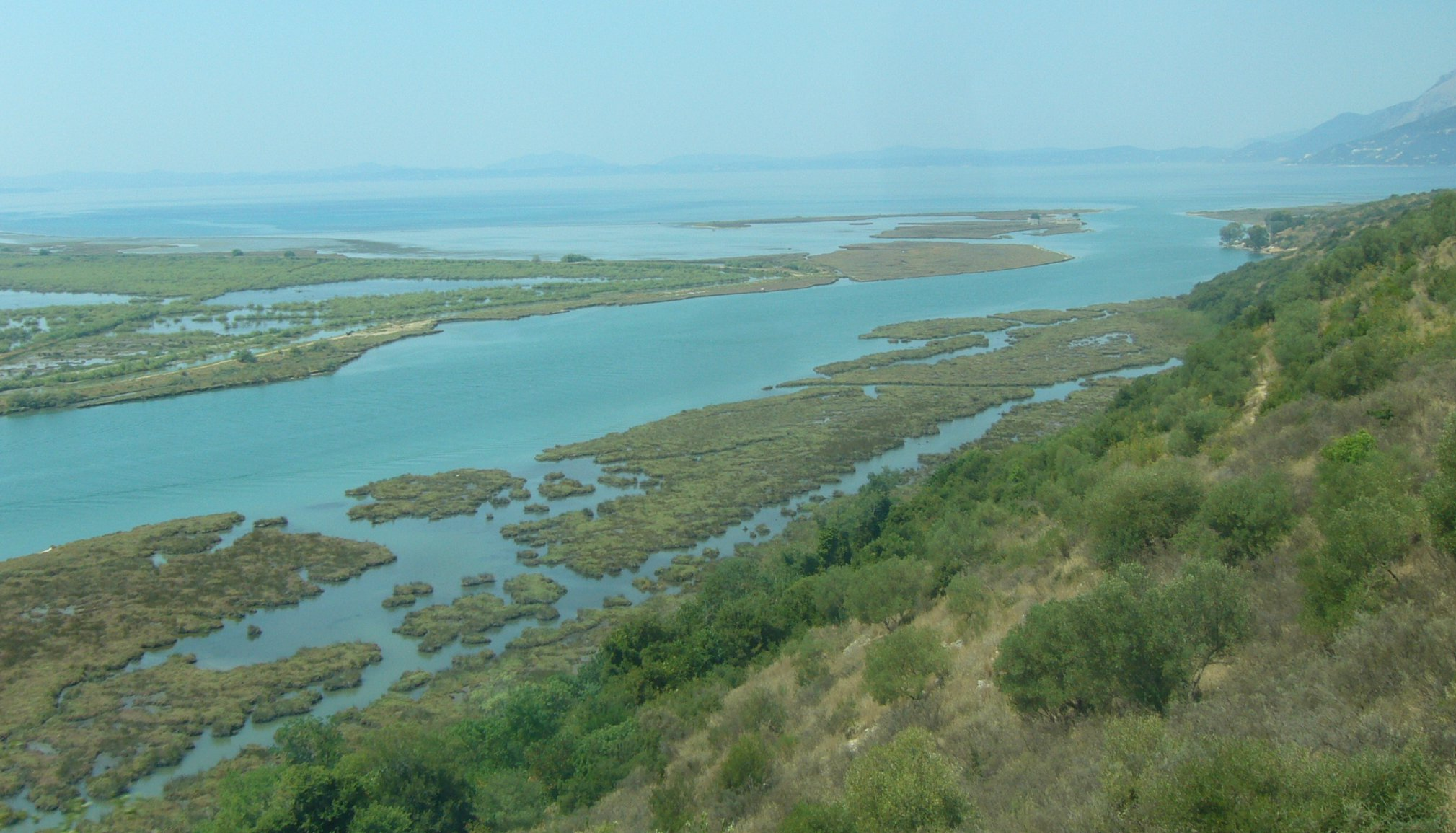
Vivari Channel in Albania links Lake Butrint with the Straits of Corfu.

In physical geography and hydrology, a channel is a landform on which a relatively narrow body of water is situated, such as a river, river delta or strait. While channel typically refers to a natural formation, the cognate term canal denotes a similar artificial structure.

Channels are important for the functionality of ports and other bodies of water used for navigability for shipping. Naturally, channels will change their depth and capacity due to erosion and deposition processes. Humans maintain navigable channels by dredging and other engineering processes.

By extension, the term also applies to fluids other than water, e.g., lava channels. The term is also traditionally used to describe the waterless surface features on Venus.

== Formation ==
Channel initiation refers to the site on a mountain slope where water begins to flow between identifiable banks. This site is referred to as the channel head and it marks an important boundary between hillslope processes and fluvial processes. The channel head is the most upslope part of a channel network and is defined by flowing water between defined identifiable banks. A channel head forms as overland flow and/or subsurface flow accumulate to a point where shear stress can overcome erosion resistance of the ground surface. Channel heads are often associated with colluvium, hollows and landslides.

Overland flow is a primary factor in channel initiation where saturation overland flow deepens to increase shear stress and begin channel incision. Overland flows converge in topographical depressions where channel initiation begins. Soil composition, vegetation, precipitation, and topography dictate the amount and rate of overland flow. The composition of a soil determines how quickly saturation occurs and cohesive strength retards the entrainment of material from overland flows. Vegetation slows infiltration rates during precipitation events and plant roots anchor soil on hillslopes.

Subsurface flow destabilizes soil and resurfaces on hillslopes where channel heads are often formed. This often results in abrupt channel heads and landslides. Hollows form due to concentrated subsurface flows where concentrations of colluvium are in a constant flux. Channel heads associated with hollows in steep terrain frequently migrate up and down hillslopes depending on sediment supply and precipitation.

== Natural channels ==
Natural channels are formed by fluvial process and are found across the Earth. These are mostly formed by flowing water from the hydrological cycle, though can also be formed by other fluids such as flowing lava can form lava channels. Channels also describe the deeper course through a reef, sand bar, bay, or any shallow body of water. An example of a river running through a sand bar is the Columbia Bar—the mouth of the Columbia River.

A stream channel is the physical confine of a stream (river) consisting of a bed and stream banks. Stream channels exist in a variety of geometries. Stream channel development is controlled by both water and sediment movement. There is a difference between low gradient streams (less than a couple of percent in gradient or slightly sloped) and high gradient streams (steeply sloped). A wide variety of stream channel types can be distinguished (e.g. braided rivers, wandering rivers, single-thread sinuous rivers etc.). During floods, water flow may exceed the capacity of the channel and flood waters will spill out of the channel and across the valley bottom, floodplain or drainage area.

Examples of rivers that are trapped in their channels: Grand Canyon and Black Canyon of the Gunnison.

In a larger nautical context, as a geographical place name, the term channel is another word for strait, which is defined as a relatively narrow body of water that connects two larger bodies of water. In this nautical context, the terms strait, channel, and passage are synonymous and usually interchangeable. For example, in an archipelago, the water between islands is typically called a channel or passage. The English Channel is the strait between England and France.

== Waterflow channels ==
The channel form is described in terms of geometry (plan, cross-sections, profile) enclosed by the materials of its bed and banks. This form is under influence of two major forces: water discharge and sediment supply. For erodible channels the mutual dependence of its parameters may be qualitatively described by Lane's Principle (also known as Lane's relationship): the product of the sediment load and bed grain size is proportional to the product of discharge and channel slope.

== Nautical channels ==
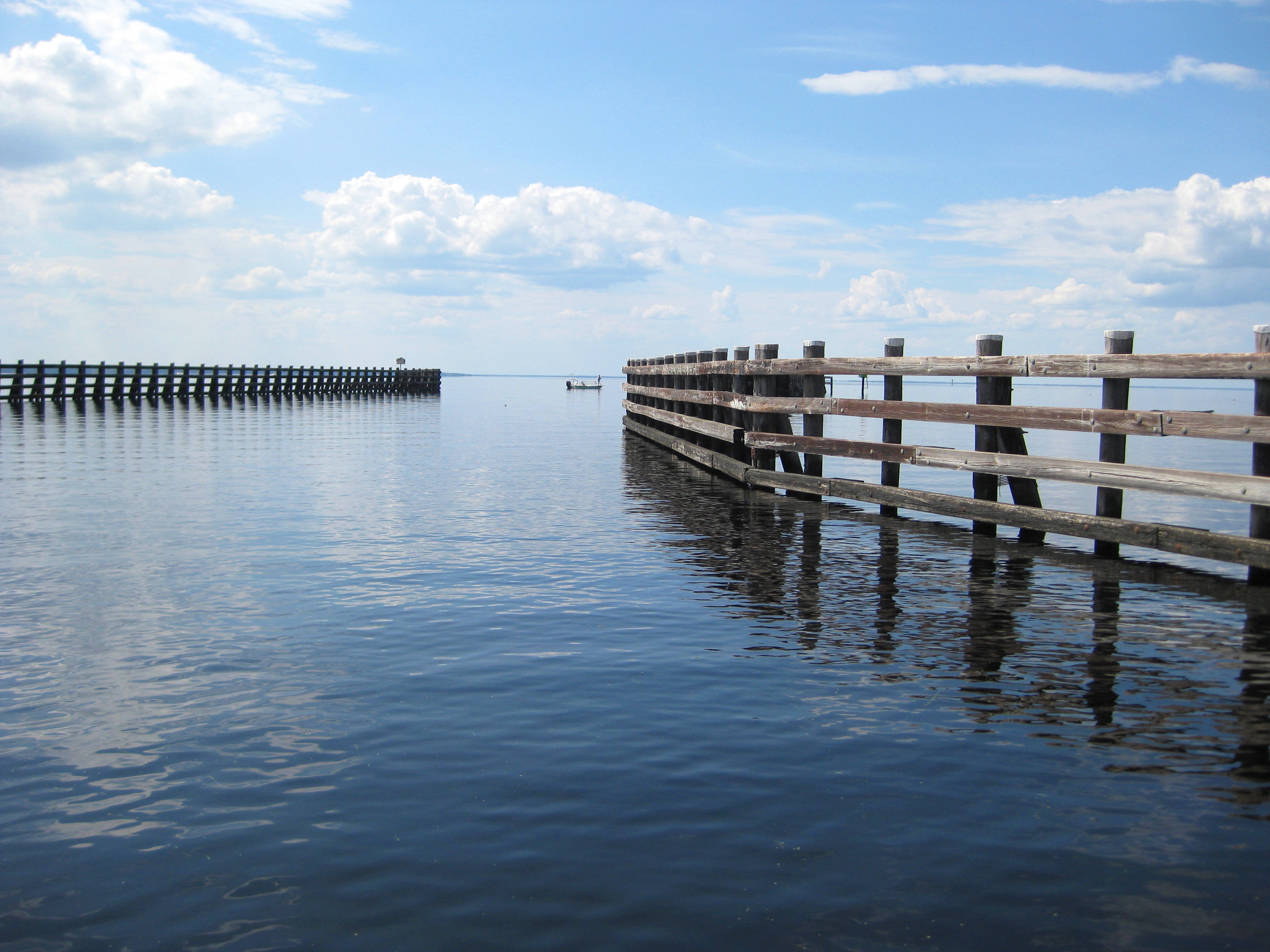
Wooden pilings mark the navigable channel for vessels entering Lake George from the St. Johns River in Florida.

A term "navigable channel" is used as a nautical term to mean a lane for ship travel, frequently marked (cf. Buoy) and sometimes dredged. Thoresen distinguishes few categories of channels, from A (suitable for day and night navigation with guaranteed fairway depth) all the way to D with no navigational aids and only estimated depths provided to the shipmaster. With regard to the dredging, channels can be unrestricted (wide enough to accommodate 10 to 15 widths of a largest ship used in this channel, semi-restricted with limited dredging in shallow waters, and fully restricted, where the entire channel is dredged. The latter, entirely human-made, channel is frequently called a canal, with the Panama Canal providing an example.

The term not only includes the deep-dredged ship-navigable parts of an estuary or river leading to port facilities, but also to lesser channels accessing boat port-facilities such as marinas. When dredged channels traverse bay mud or sandy bottoms, repeated dredging is often necessary because of the unstable subsequent movement of benthic soils.

Responsibility for monitoring navigability conditions of navigation channels to various port facilities varies, and the actual maintenance work is frequently performed by a third party. Storms, sea-states, flooding, and seasonal sedimentation adversely affect navigability. In the U.S., navigation channels are monitored and maintained by the United States Army Corps of Engineers (USACE), although dredging operations are often carried out by private contractors (under USACE supervision). USACE also monitors water quality and some remediation. This was first established under the Rivers and Harbors Act of 1899 and modified under acts of 1913, 1935, and 1938. For example, the USACE developed the Intracoastal Waterway, and has the Mississippi Valley Division responsible for the Mississippi River from the Gulf to Cairo, Illinois, the North Atlantic Division for New York Harbor and Port of Boston, and the South Pacific Division for Port of Los Angeles and Port of Long Beach. Waterways policing as well as some emergency spill response falls under United States Coast Guard jurisdiction, including inland channels serving ports like Saint Louis hundreds of miles from any coast. The various state or local governments maintain lesser channels, for example former Erie Canal.

== See also ==
- Channel pattern
- Channelization (rivers)
- Hydrology transport model
- Lava channel
- Ship canal
- Stream flow
- Stream gradient
- Stream restoration
- Surge channel
- Thalweg

== Sources ==
- Thoresen, Carl A. (2003). Port Designer's Handbook: Recommendations and Guidelines. Thomas Telford. ISBN 978-0-7277-3228-6.
- Fahmy, Wael Ahmed; Hekal, Nasr Tawfik Hassan (January 2023). "Upgrading the Navigable Channels along the River Nile within Egypt for Satisfying New Transportation Requirements" (PDF). Journal of Advanced Engineering Trends. 42 (1): 33–47. doi:10.21608/jaet.2021.70109.1105. ISSN 2682-2091. S2CID 245210824.
