= Carex ultra =

Conservation status
- Vulnerable (NatureServe)

Scientific classification
- Kingdom: Plantae
- Clade: Tracheophytes
- Clade: Angiosperms
- Clade: Monocots
- Clade: Commelinids
- Order: Poales
- Family: Cyperaceae
- Genus: Carex
- Species: C. ultra

Binomial name
- Carex ultra L.H.Bailey

Synonyms
- Carex spissa var. ultra (L.H.Bailey) Kük.

Species of plant

Carex ultra, the Cochise sedge, is a species of flowering plant in the family Cyperaceae. It is native to the U.S. states of Arizona and New Mexico, and northwestern Mexico. A rhizomatous perennial reaching 1.1 m (3.5 ft), it is typically found on alongside streams, or in seeps, and can tolerate serpentine soils.
