= Puddle =

Small accumulation of liquid, usually water, on a surface

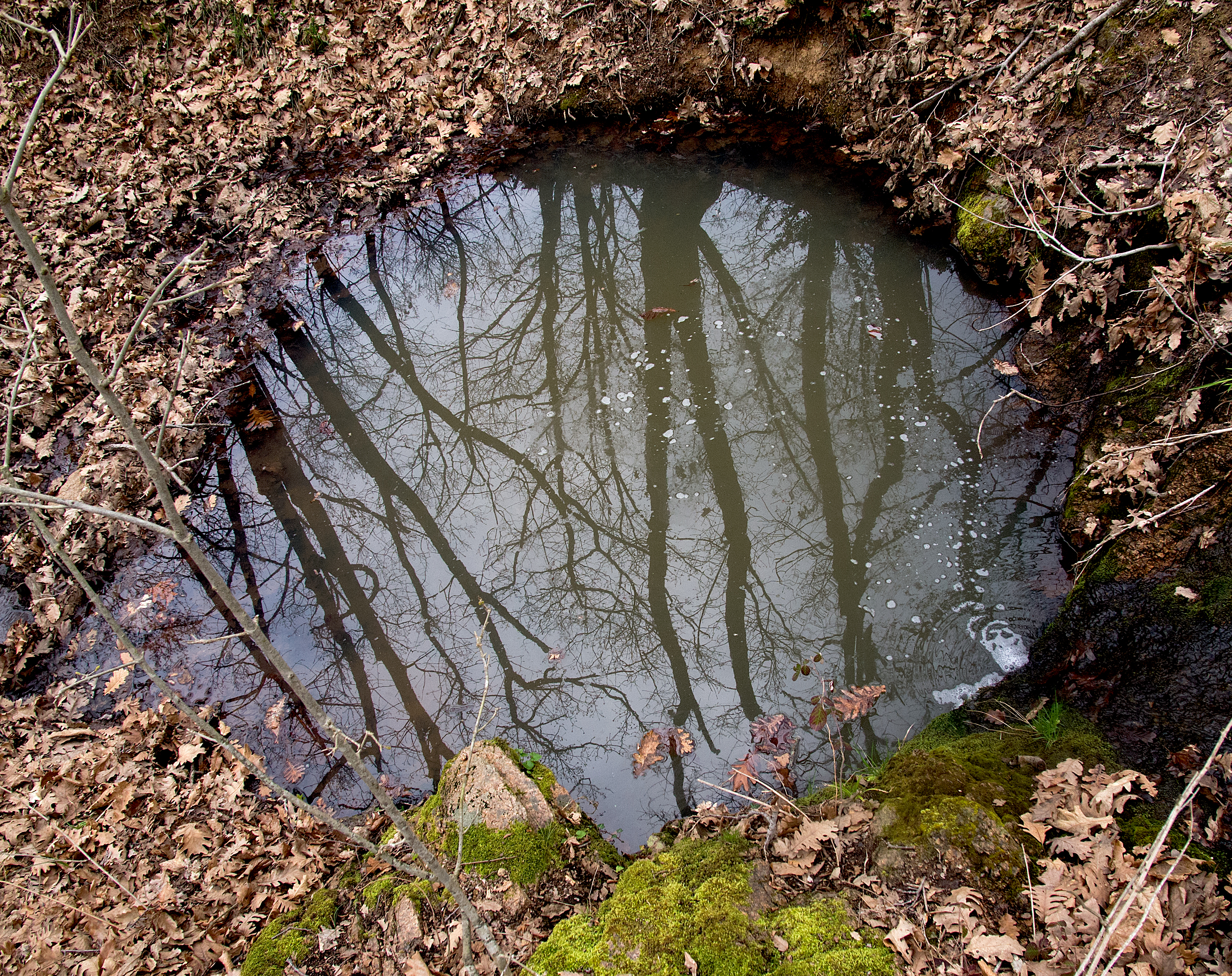
Reflections in a forest puddle

A puddle is a small accumulation of liquid, usually water, on a surface. It can form either by pooling in a depression on the surface, or by surface tension upon a flat surface. Puddles are often characterized by murky water or mud due to the disturbance and dissolving of surrounding sediment, primarily due to precipitation.

Generally a puddle is shallow enough to walk through, and too small to traverse with a boat or raft. Small wildlife may be attracted to puddles.

== Natural puddles and wildlife ==
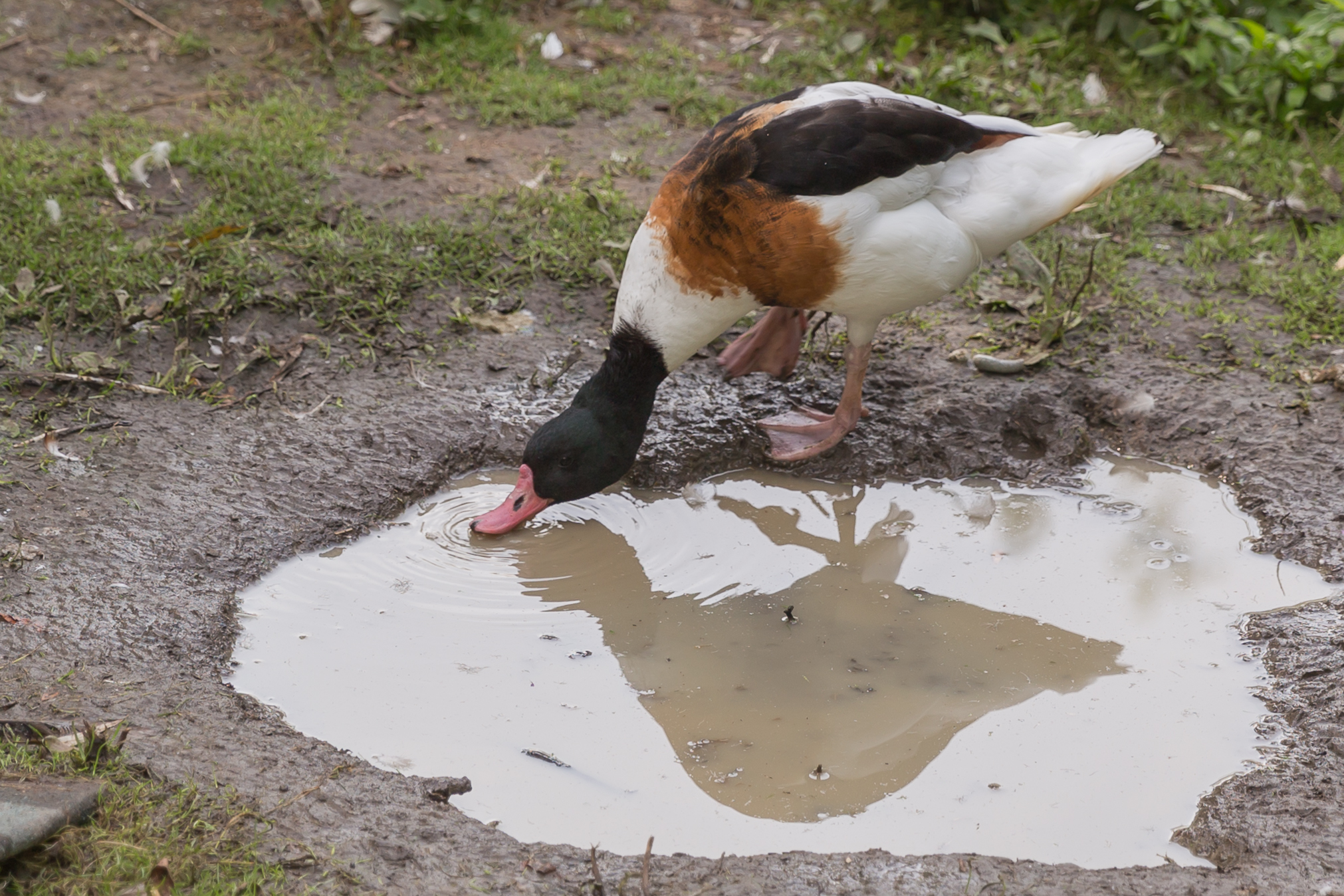
A common shelduck drinking from a puddle

Puddles in natural landscapes and habitats, when not resulting from precipitation, can indicate the presence of a seep or spring. Small seasonal riparian plants, grasses, and wildflowers can germinate with the ephemeral "head start" of moisture provided by a puddle.

Small wildlife, such as birds and insects, can use puddles as a source of essential moisture or for bathing. Raised constructed puddles, bird baths, are a part of domestic and wildlife gardens as a garden ornament and "micro-habitat" restoration. Swallows use the damp loam which gathers in puddles as a form of cement to help to build their nests. Many butterfly species and some other insects, but particularly male butterflies, need puddles for nutrients they can contain, such as salts and amino acids. In a behaviour known as puddling they seek out the damp mud that can be found around the edge of the puddles.

For some smaller forms of life, such as tadpoles or mosquito larvae, a puddle can form an entire habitat. Puddles that do not evaporate quickly can become standing water, which can become polluted by decaying organisms and are often home to breeding mosquitos, which can act as vectors for diseases such as malaria and, of more recent concern in certain areas of the world, West Nile virus.

== Puddles on roads ==
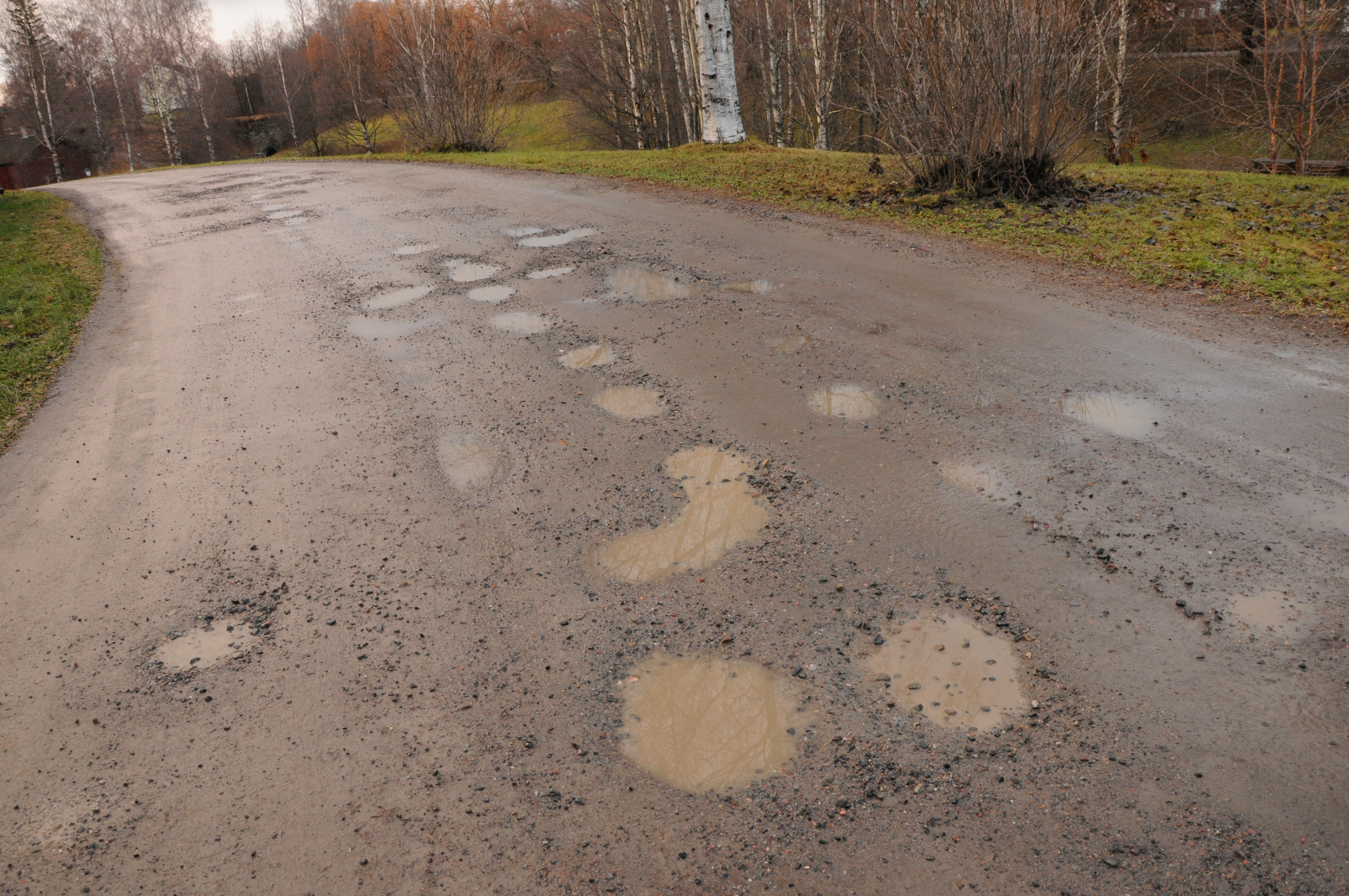
Puddles formed from rainwater, filling potholes on a road

Puddles commonly form during rain, and can cause problems for transport. Due to the angle of the road, puddles tend to be forced by gravity to gather on the edges of the road. This can cause splashing as cars drive through the puddles, which causes water to be sprayed onto pedestrians on the pavement. Irresponsible drivers may do this deliberately, which, in some countries, can lead to prosecution for careless driving.

Puddles commonly form in potholes in a dirt road, or in any other space with a shallow depression and dirt. In such cases, these are sometimes referred to as mud puddles, because mud tends to form in the bottoms, resulting in dirtied wheels or boots when disturbed.

In order to deal with puddles, roads and pavements are often built with a camber (technically called 'crowning'), being slightly convex in nature, to force puddles to drain into the gutter, which has storm drain grates to allow the water to drain into the sewers. In addition, some surfaces are made to be porous, allowing the water to drain through the surface to the aquifer below.

== Physics ==
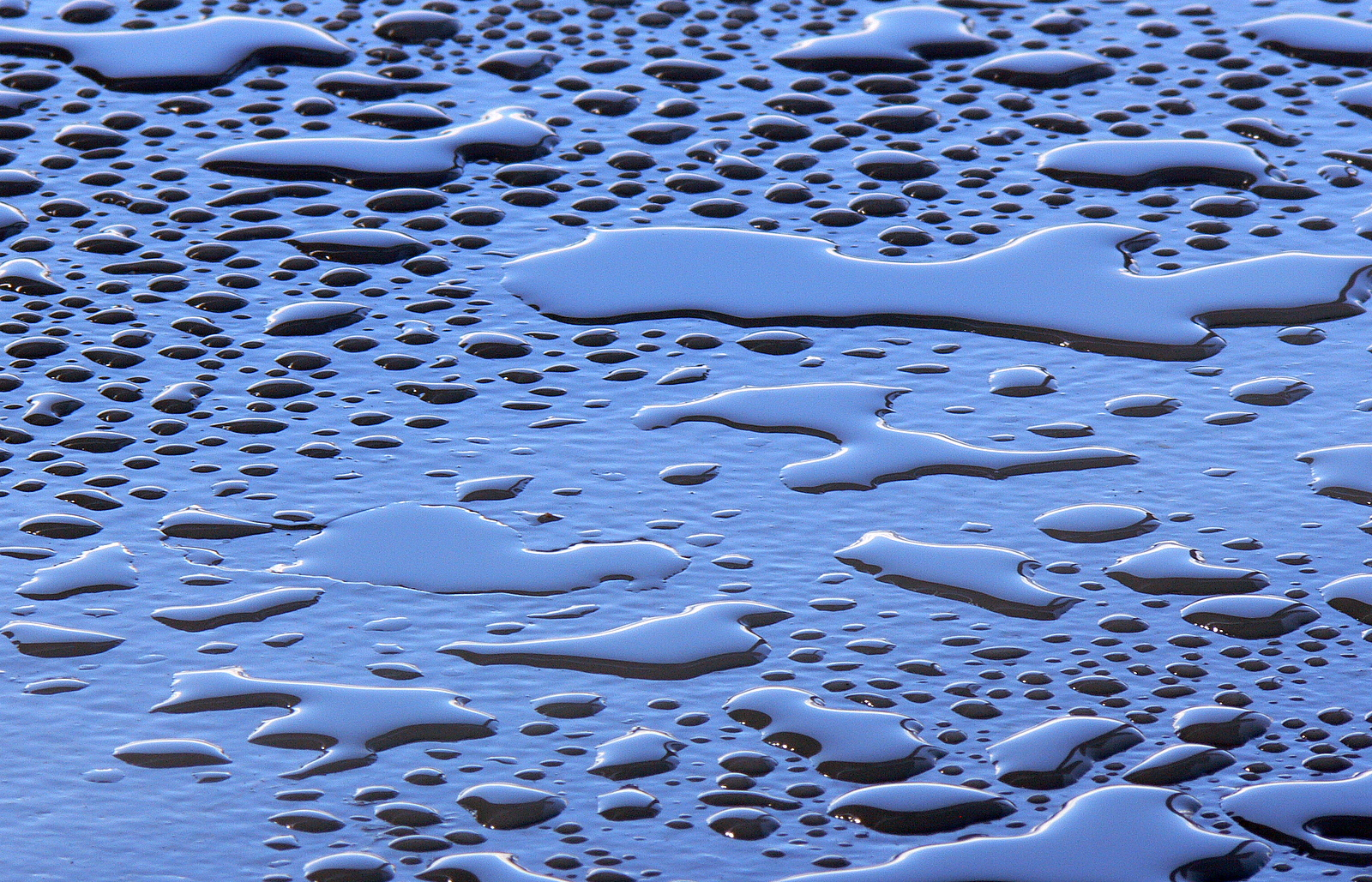
Small puddles held together by surface tension

Due to the action of surface tension, small puddles can also form if a liquid is spilt on a level surface. Puddles like this are common on kitchen floors. Puddles tend to evaporate quickly due to the high surface-area-to-volume ratio. In cold conditions puddles can form patches of ice which are slippery and difficult to see and can be a hazard to road vehicles and pedestrians.

== Children ==
Puddles are a source of recreation for children, who often like jumping in puddles as an "up-side" to rain. Puddles can create beautiful mirror-like reflections that fascinate children. A children's nursery rhyme records the story of Doctor Foster and his encounter with a puddle in Gloucester. Muddy puddles, and the pleasures of splashing mud in them, are a repeated theme in the children's animation Peppa Pig, to the extent of selling character-branded Wellington boots.

== See also ==
- Black ice
- Puddle (M. C. Escher)
- Puddling (biology)
- Pond, a somewhat larger accumulation of liquid on a surface
- Puddling (civil engineering)
- Puddling (metallurgy)
- Rill
- Seep (hydrology)
- Spring (hydrology)
