= Vladimir Lokhtin =

Russian hydrologist

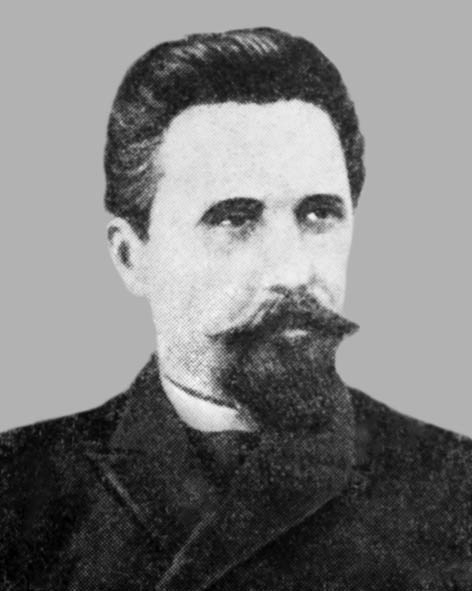

Vladimir Mikhailovich Lokhtin (Russian: Владимир Михайлович Лохтин 1849 – 1919) was a Russian hydrologist who examined the mechanism of riverbed and channel maintenance and stability based on the slope and the size of the sediment at the bottom of the river.

Lokhtin was born in St. Petersburg and graduated in 1875 in the institute of railways engineers following which he joined the ministry of railways and was involved in surveys of the Kama River. From 1878 he worked in the navigation commission and headed a survey of the Dniester in 1882 and then on the Volga near Nizhny Novgorod from 1892 where there was an effort in straightening the river flow. He was involved in studies for water transport and in 1904 examined ice conditions on the Neva river. From 1907 he was inspector for metalled roads. His major work on hydrology was published in 1895, O mekhanizme rechnogo rusla ("On the Mechanism of a Riverbed" 1895), in which he examined the slope of the river, the erosion of the river bottom and the water discharge regime based on which he used a measure known now as the Lokhtin coefficient which could be used to determine if a stream would tend to flow in one channel, deepen, become shallower, or separate into braided channels. He also examined the mechanism of formation of shoals and spits.

The Lokhtin coefficient is used as an indicator of stability of river channels:

$$L = \frac{d}{\Delta H}$$

where d is the average (or often the median) particle diameter of the sediment in mm and ∆H is the fall of the river (in m / km). Lokhtin's work was further improved upon by N.I. Makkaveyev (1908–1983).
