= Channel types =

A wide variety of river and stream channel types exist in limnology, the study of inland waters. All these can be divided into two groups by using the water-flow gradient as either low gradient channels for streams or rivers with less than two percent (2%) flow gradient, or high gradient channels for those with greater than a 2% gradient.

== Low gradient channels ==
Low gradient channels of rivers and streams can be divided into braided rivers, wandering rivers, single thread sinuous rivers (meandering), and anastomosing rivers. The channel type developed depends on stream gradient, riparian vegetation and sediment supply. Braided rivers tend to occur on steeper gradients where there is a large supply of sediment for braid bars, while single thread sinuous channels occur where there is a lower sediment supply for point bars. Anastomosing channels are multithreaded, but are much more stable than braided channels and commonly have thick clay and silt banks and occur at lower gradients of stream bed. Wandering rivers fall between sinuous single thread and braided streams and are relatively stable multi-channel gravel bed rivers.

== High gradient channels ==
High gradient channels of rivers and streams have been divided into riffle-pool (which can cover all of the low gradient channel morphologies discussed above), rapid/plane bed, step-pool and cascade unit morphologies.

- Riffle-pool sequence channels are composed of migrating pools and transverse bars called riffles and occur on gradients less than 1-2 percent.
- Rapids (also called plane bed, but not to be confused with the plane beds described in sand bed rivers) lack distinct pools and bars but commonly have stone cells or clusters and occur on gradients in the range of 1-5 percent, and have "whitewater".
- Step-pools are composed of channel-spanning pools and boulder/cobble steps that cause subcritical flow in the pool and supercritical flow over the steps. They occur in gradients in the range of 5 and 20%.
- Cascade units exist at steeper gradients (approx > 10–15 percent) where the channel is dominated by boulders and cobbles and channel spanning pools do not exist. Pocket pools are common. In all four channel types large woody debris may strongly influence the channel type.

== See also ==
- Relief ratio
- Stream gradient
- Stream restoration
  - Riparian zone restoration
- Vladimir Lokhtin

== References and further reading ==
- See Church (1992) for more details on low gradient streams and Grant et al. (1990) and Buffington and Montgomery (1997) for more details regarding high gradient streams.
- Buffington, J. M., and D. R. Montgomery (1997), A systematic analysis of eight decades of incipient motion studies, with special reference to gravel-bedded rivers, Water Resources Research, 33, 1993-2029.
- Church, M. (1992), Channel morphology and topology, in The River Handbook, edited by P. Calow and G. E. Petts, pp. 126–143, Blackwell.
- Grant, G. E., F. J. Swanson, and M. G. Wolman (1990), Pattern and origin of stepped-bed morphology in high gradient streams, western Cascades, Oregon, Geological Society of America, Bulletin, 102, 340-352.
