= List of fluvial landforms =

Landforms related to rivers and other watercourses include:

- Channel (geography) – Narrow body of water
- Confluence – Meeting of two or more bodies of flowing water
- Cut bank – Outside bank of a water channel, which is continually undergoing erosion
- Crevasse splay – Sediment deposited on a floodplain by a stream which breaks its levees
- Drainage basin – Land area where water converges to a common outlet (watershed)
- Esker – Long, winding ridge of stratified sand and gravel associated with former glaciers
- Floodplain – Land adjacent to a water body which is flooded during periods of high water
- Fluvial landforms of streams
- Fluvial terrace – Elongated terraces that flank the sides of floodplains and river valleys
- Canyon – Deep chasm between cliffs (Gorge)
- Gully – Landform created by running water and/or mass movement eroding sharply into soil
- Island – Piece of subcontinental land surrounded by water
- Levee § Natural levees
- Meander – One of a series of curves in a channel of a matured stream
- Oxbow lake – U-shaped lake or pool left by an ancient river meander
- Pendant bar – fluvial landform formed on the downstream side of a weathering-resistant protrusion
- Plunge pool – Depression at the base of a waterfall
- Point bar – Landform related to streams and rivers
- Pothole – Natural bowl-shaped hollow carved into a streambed
- Riffle – Shallow landform in a flowing channel
- River – Natural flowing freshwater stream
- River delta – Silt deposition landform at the mouth of a river
- River island – Exposed landmass within a river
- River valley, also known as vale – Low area between hills, often with a river running through it
- Shoal, also known as bar – Natural submerged sandbank that rises from a body of water to near the surface
- Spring (hydrology) – Point at which water emerges from an aquifer to the surface
- Stream – Body of surface water flowing down a channel
- Stream pool – Deep and slow-moving stretch of a watercourse
- Waterfall – A point in a river or stream where water flows over a vertical drop
- Yazoo stream – Hydrologic term

== See also ==
- Glossary_of_landforms
  - Glossary_of_landforms#Fluvial_landforms
