= Seep =

Type of groundwater spring

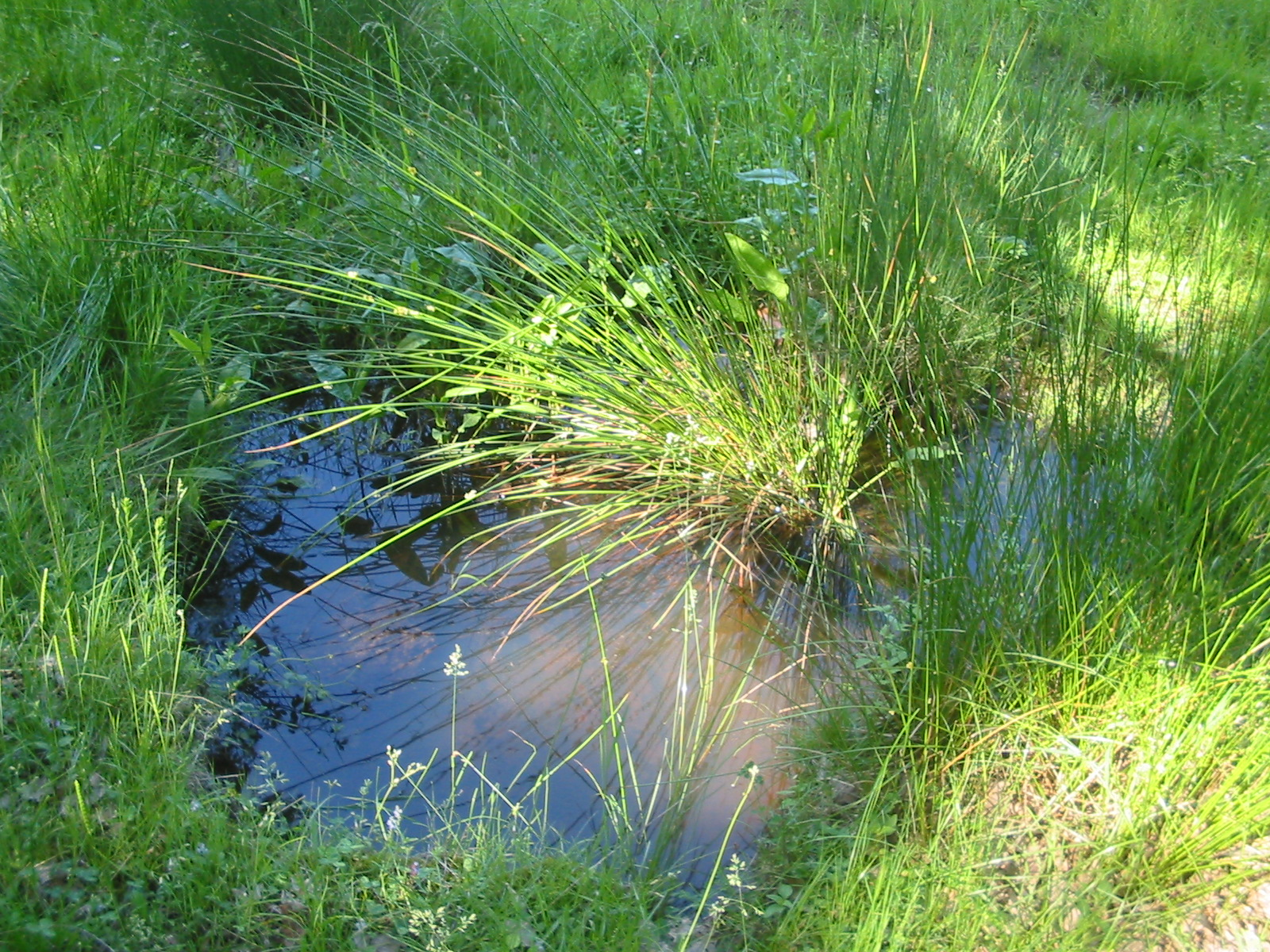
A seep puddle in a forest clearing

A seep or flush is a moist or wet place where water, usually groundwater, reaches the Earth's surface from an underground aquifer.

== Description ==
Seeps are usually not of sufficient volume to be flowing beyond their immediate above-ground location. They are part of the limnology-geomorphology system. Like a higher volume spring, the water is only from underground sources. Seeps mostly occur in lower elevation areas because water runs downhill, but can happen higher up if the groundwater present is abundant enough. Along with natural seeps, man made seeps can occur by digging anywhere where there is wet ground. This method can be useful for survival purposes and helps the local wildlife by adding another water source to the area.

Seeps often form a puddle, and are important for small wildlife, bird, and butterfly habitat and moisture needs. When they support mud-puddling, many butterfly (Lepidoptera) species, including some types that are endemic endangered species, can obtain nutrients such as salts and amino acids.

== Environmental technology ==
Seep is often used in environmental sciences to define an exfiltration zone (seepage zone) where contaminated water, e.g., from waste dumps, leaves a waste system area.

Seeps are often important smaller wildlife water sources, and indicated by lower riparian vegetation.

== Stream recharge system ==
Seeps can also contribute to streams. If a stream is flowing below a water table then the stream receives contributions from the ground water via seepage. This allows drainage of the ground water and more substantial streamflow. The seep could be especially effective during a rainless period of the area, in which the seep can prolong the stream’s flow by adding water from the groundwater.

== See also ==
- Mud-puddling
- Rill
- Riparian zone restoration
- Soil mechanics § Seepage: steady state flow of water
