= Stream gradient =

Surface slope along a watercourse

Stream gradient (or stream slope) is the grade (or slope) of a stream. It is measured by the ratio of drop in elevation and horizontal distance. It is a dimensionless quantity, usually expressed in units of meters per kilometer (m/km) or feet per mile (ft/mi); it may also be expressed in percent (%). The world average river reach slope is 2.6 m/km or 0.26%; a slope smaller than 1% and greater than 4% is considered gentle and steep, respectively.

Stream gradient may change along the stream course. An average gradient can be defined, known as the relief ratio, which gives the average drop in elevation per unit length of river. The calculation is the difference in elevation between the river's source and the river terminus (confluence or mouth) divided by the total length of the river or stream.

== Hydrology and geology ==
A high gradient indicates a steep slope and rapid flow of water (i.e. more ability to erode); where as a low gradient indicates a more nearly level stream bed and sluggishly moving water, that may be able to carry only small amounts of very fine sediment. High gradient streams tend to have steep, narrow V-shaped valleys, and are referred to as young streams. Low gradient streams have wider and less rugged valleys, with a tendency for the stream to meander. Many rivers involve, to some extent, a flattening of the river gradient as approach the terminus at sea level.

== Fluvial erosion ==
A stream that flows upon a uniformly erodible substrate will tend to have a steep gradient near its source, and a low gradient nearing zero as it reaches its base level. Of course, a uniform substrate would be rare in nature; hard layers of rock along the way may establish a temporary base level, followed by a high gradient, or even a waterfall, as softer materials are encountered below the hard layer.

Human dams, glaciation, changes in sea level, and many other factors can also change the "normal" or natural gradient pattern.

== Topographic mapping ==
On topographic maps, stream gradient can be easily approximated if the scale of the map and the contour intervals are known. Contour lines form a V-shape on the map, pointing upstream. By counting the number of lines that cross a certain segment of a stream, multiplying this by the contour interval, and dividing that quantity by the length of the stream segment, one obtains an approximation to the stream gradient.

Because stream gradient is customarily given in feet per 1000 feet, one should then measure the amount a stream segment rises and the length of the stream segment in feet, then multiply feet per foot gradient by 1000. For example, if one measures a scale mile along the stream length, and counts three contour lines crossed on a map with ten-foot contours, the gradient is approximately 5.7 feet per 1000 feet, a fairly steep gradient.

== See also ==
- Channel types
- Discharge (hydrology)
- Hydraulic gradient, concept used for aquifers
- Manning equation
- Rapids
- Thalweg
- Types of waterfall
