= Large woody debris =

Fallen wood in rivers

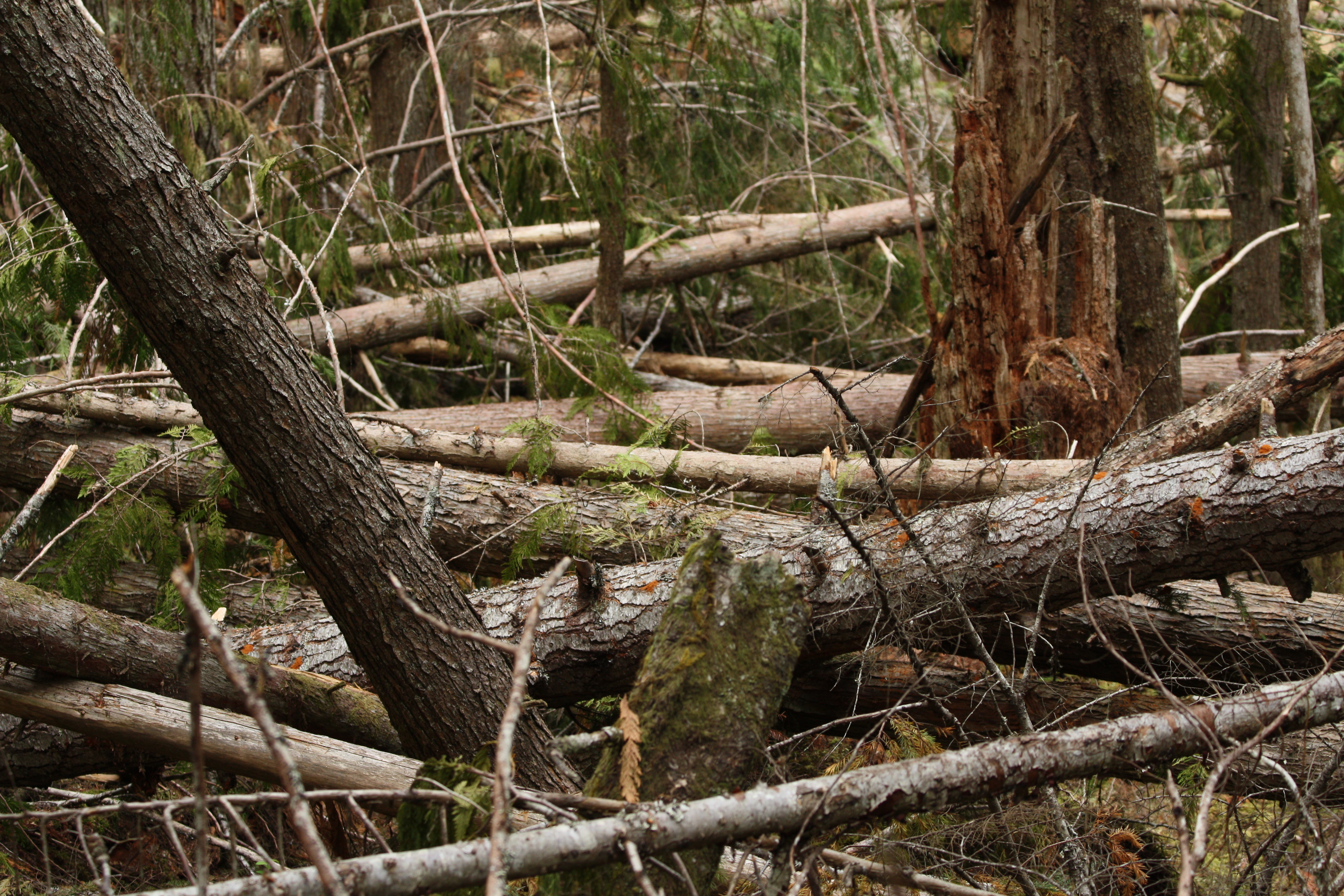
Wind-felled trees are a source of large woody debris.

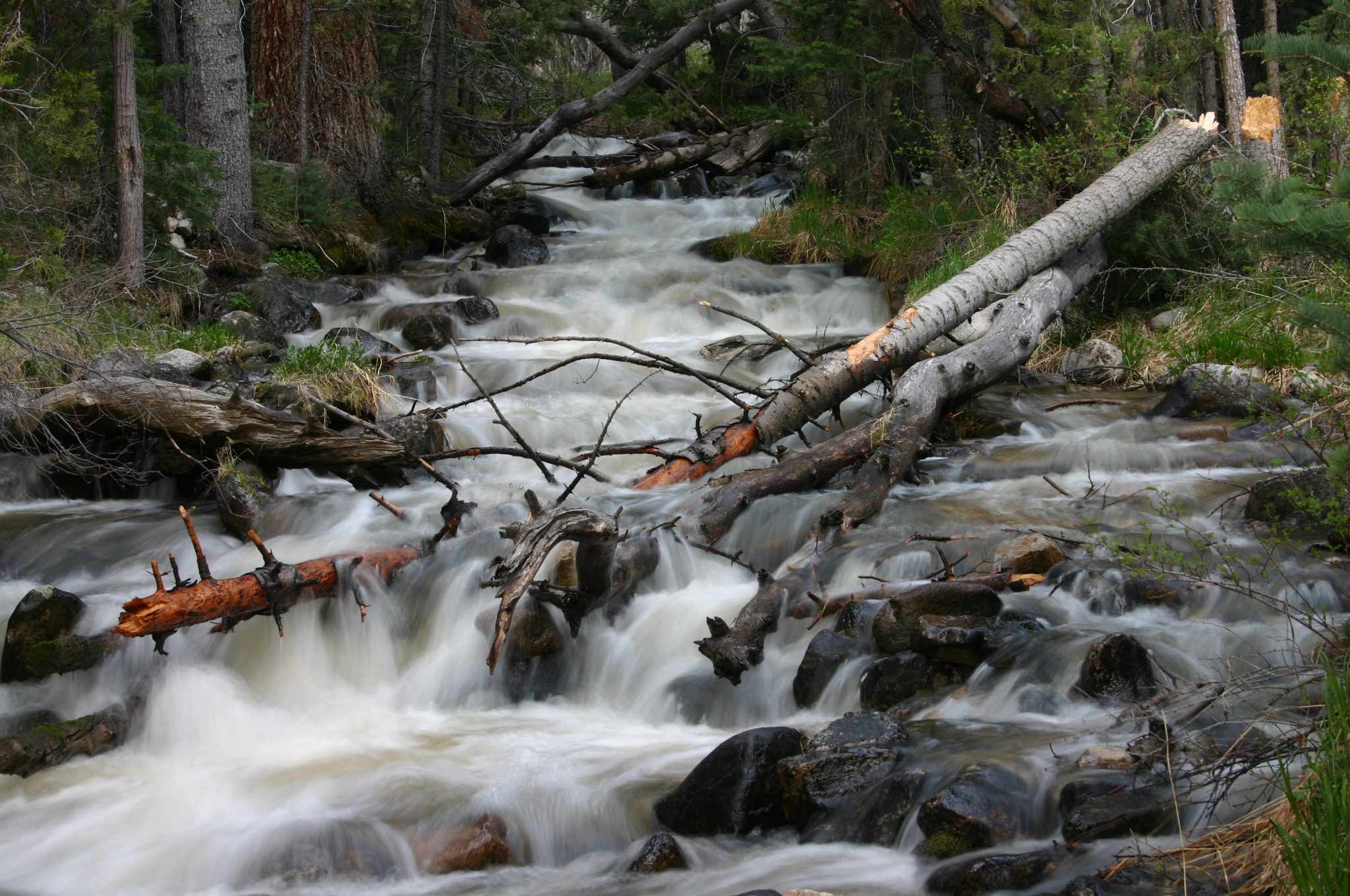
Large woody debris helps to form pools in streams, which are important habitats for fish and other species.

Large woody debris (LWD) are the logs, sticks, branches, and other wood that falls into streams and rivers. This debris can influence the flow and the shape of the stream channel. Large woody debris, grains, and the shape of the bed of the stream are the three main providers of flow resistance, and are thus a major influence on the shape of the stream channel. Some stream channels have less LWD than they would naturally because of removal by watershed managers for flood control and aesthetic reasons.

The study of woody debris is important for its forestry management implications. Plantation thinning can reduce the potential for recruitment of LWD into proximal streams. The presence of large woody debris is important in the formation of pools which serve as salmon habitat in the Pacific Northwest. Entrainment of the large woody debris in a stream can also cause erosion and scouring around and under the LWD. The amount of scouring and erosion is determined by the ratio of the diameter of the piece, to the depth of the stream, and the embedding and orientation of the piece.

== Influence on stream flow around bends ==
Large woody debris slows the flow through a bend in the stream, while accelerating flow in the constricted area downstream of the obstruction.

== See also ==
- Beaver dam
- Coarse woody debris
- Driftwood
- Log jam
- Stream restoration
