= Riparian-zone restoration =

Ecological restoration of river banks and floodplains

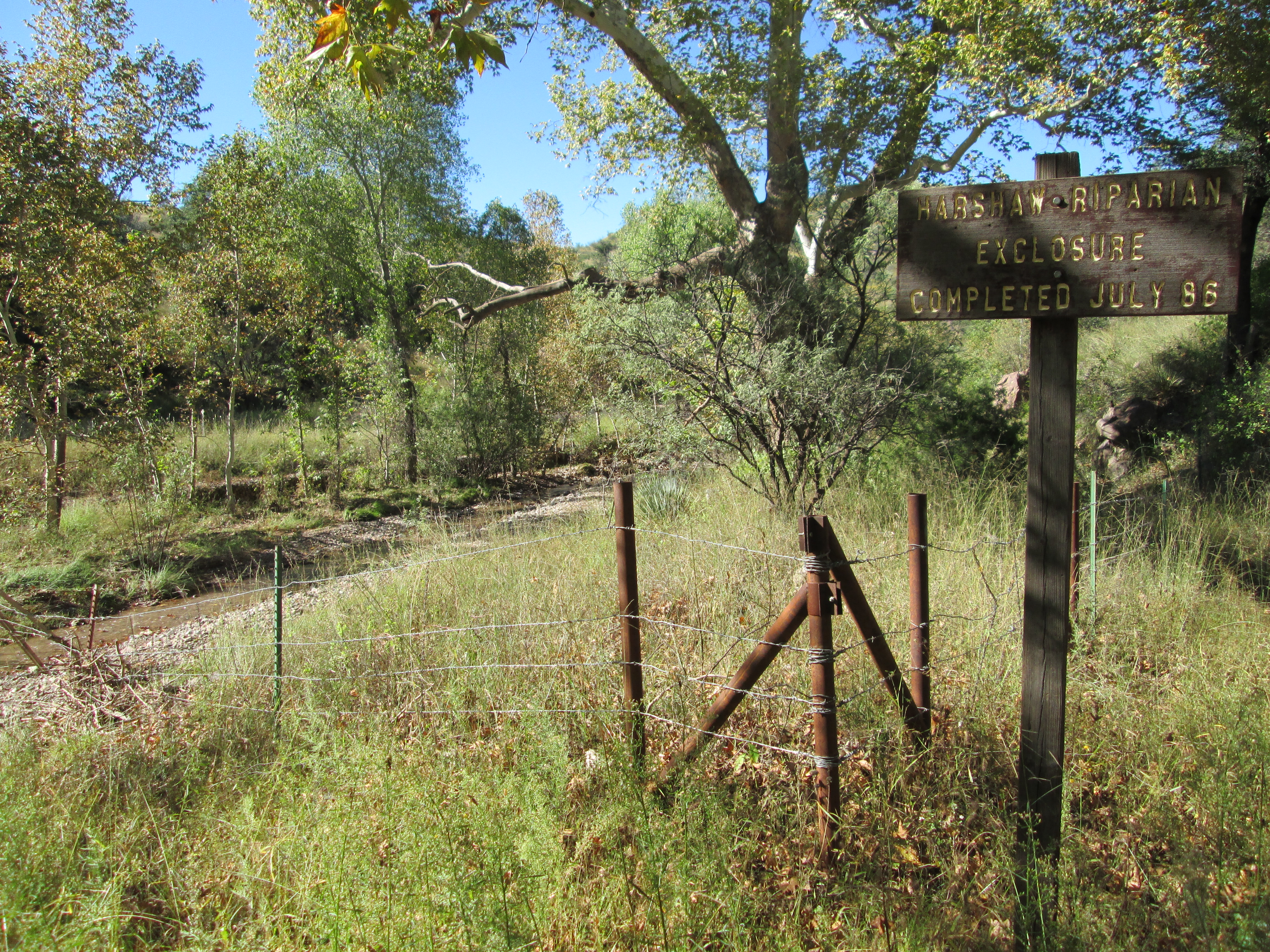
The Harshaw Riparian Exclosure in southern Arizona was established in 1986 to help protect and restore the riparian zone along Harshaw Creek. Notice the young cottonwood and sycamore trees at the left.

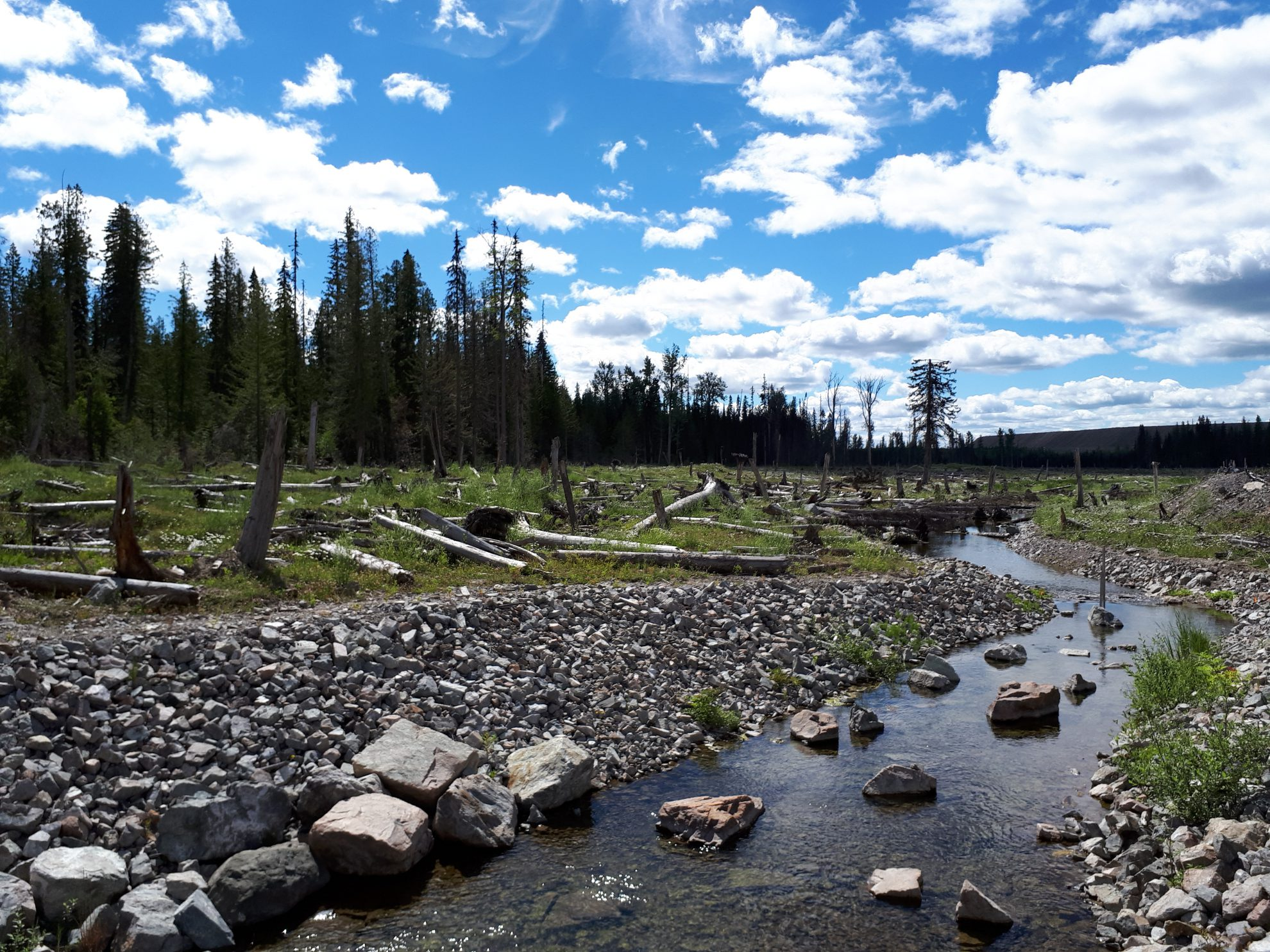
Mount Polley mine restoration of the river banks and surrounding areas of Hazeltine Creek in British Columbia, Canada

Riparian-zone restoration is the ecological restoration of riparian-zone habitats of streams, rivers, springs, lakes, floodplains, and other hydrologic ecologies. A riparian zone or riparian area is the interface between land and a river or stream. Riparian is also the proper nomenclature for one of the fifteen terrestrial biomes of the earth; the habitats of plant and animal communities along the margins and river banks are called riparian vegetation, characterized by aquatic plants and animals that favor them. Riparian zones are significant in ecology, environmental management, and civil engineering because of their role in soil conservation, their habitat biodiversity, and the influence they have on fauna and aquatic ecosystems, including grassland, woodland, wetland or sub-surface features such as water tables. In some regions the terms riparian woodland, riparian forest, riparian buffer zone, or riparian strip are used to characterize a riparian zone.

The perceived need for riparian-zone restoration has come about because riparian zones have been altered and/or degraded throughout much of the world by the activities of mankind affecting natural geologic forces. The unique biodiversity of riparian ecosystems and the potential benefits that natural, vegetated riparian have to offer in preventing erosion, maintaining water quality that ranges from being decent to completely healthy, providing habitat and wildlife corridors, and maintaining the health of in-stream biota (aquatic organisms) has led to a surge of restoration activities aimed at riparian ecosystems in the last few decades. Restoration efforts are typically guided by an ecological understanding of riparian-zone processes and knowledge of the causes of degradation. They are often interdependent with stream restoration projects.

== Causes of riparian-zone degradation ==
Riparian-zone disturbance falls into two main categories: hydrologic modifications that indirectly impact riparian communities through changes in stream morphology and hydrologic processes, and habitat alterations that result in direct modification of riparian communities through land clearing or disturbance.

=== Hydrologic modifications ===
==== Dams and diversions ====
Dams are built on rivers primarily to store water for human use, generate hydroelectric power, and/or control flooding. Natural riparian ecosystems upstream of dams can be destroyed when newly created reservoirs inundate riparian habitat. Dams can also cause substantial changes in downstream riparian communities by altering the magnitude, frequency, and timing of flood events and reducing the amount of sediment and nutrients delivered from upstream. Diverting water from stream channels for agricultural, industrial, and human use reduces the volume of water flowing downstream, and can have similar effects.

In a natural riparian system, periodic flooding can remove sections of riparian vegetation. This leaves portions of the floodplain available for regeneration and effectively “resets” the successional timeline. Frequent disturbance naturally favors many early-successional (pioneer) riparian species. Many studies show that a reduction in flooding due to dams and diversions can allow community succession to progress beyond a typical stage, causing changes in community structure.

Changing flood regimes can be especially problematic when exotic species are favored by altered conditions. For example, dam regulation changes floodplain hydrology in the southwest US by impeding annual flooding cycles. This modification has been implicated in the dominance of saltcedar (Tamarix chinensis) over the native cottonwood (Populus deltoides). Cottonwoods were found to be competitively superior to saltcedar when flooding allowed seeds of both species to cogerminate. However, the lack of flooding caused by altered hydrology creates more favorable conditions for the germination of saltcedar over cottonwoods.

==== Groundwater withdrawals ====
Riparian zones are characterized by a distinct community of plant species that are physiologically adapted to a greater amount of freshwater than upland species. In addition to having frequent direct contact with surface water through periodic rises in stream water levels and flooding, riparian zones are also characterized by their proximity to groundwater. Particularly in arid regions, shallow groundwater, seeps, and springs provide a more constant source of water to riparian vegetation than occasional flooding. By reducing the availability of water, groundwater withdrawals can impact the health of riparian vegetation. For example, Fremont cottonwood (Populus fremontii), and San Joaquin willow (Salix gooddingii), common riparian species in Arizona, were found to have more dead branches and experienced greater mortality with decreasing groundwater levels.

Plant community composition can change dramatically over a gradient of groundwater depth: plants that can only survive in wetland conditions can be replaced by plants that are tolerant of drier conditions as groundwater levels are reduced, causing habitat community shifts and in some cases complete loss of riparian species. Studies have also shown that decreases in groundwater levels may favor the invasion and persistence of certain exotic invasive species such as Saltcedar (Tamarix chinensis), which do not appear to show the same degree of physiologic water stress as native species when subjected to lower groundwater levels.

==== Stream channelization and levee construction ====
Stream channelization is the process of engineering straighter, wider, and deeper stream channels, usually for improved navigation, wetland drainage, and/or faster transport of flood waters downstream. Levees are often constructed in conjunction with channelization to protect human development and agricultural fields from flooding. Riparian vegetation can be directly removed or damaged during and after the channelization process. In addition, channelization and levee construction modify the natural hydrology of a stream system. As water flows through a natural stream, meanders are created when faster flowing water erodes outer banks and slower flowing water deposits sediment on inner banks. Many riparian plant species depend on these areas of new sediment deposition for germination and establishment of seedlings. Channel straightening and levee construction eliminate these areas of deposition, creating unfavorable conditions for riparian vegetation recruitment.

By preventing overbank flooding, levees reduce the amount of water available to riparian vegetation in the floodplain, which alters the types of vegetation that can persist in these conditions. A lack of flooding has been shown to decrease the amount of habitat heterogeneity in riparian ecosystems as wetland depressions in the floodplain no longer fill and hold water. Because habitat heterogeneity is correlated with species diversity, levees can cause reductions in the overall biodiversity of riparian ecosystems.

=== Habitat alteration ===
==== Land clearing ====
In many places around the world, vegetation within riparian zones has been completely removed as humans have cleared land for raising crops, growing timber, and developing land for commercial or residential purposes. Removing riparian vegetation increases the erodibility of stream banks, and can also speed the rate of channel migration (unless the newly cleared banks are lined with riprap, retaining walls, or concrete). In addition, removal of riparian vegetation fragments the remaining riparian ecosystem, which can prevent or hinder dispersal of species between habitat patches. This can diminish riparian plant diversity, as well as decrease abundances and diversity of migratory birds or other species that depend on large, undisturbed areas of habitat. Fragmentation can also prevent gene flow between isolated riparian patches, reducing genetic diversity.

==== Livestock grazing ====
Cattle have a propensity to aggregate around water, which can be detrimental to riparian ecosystems. While native ungulates such as deer are commonly found in riparian zones, livestock may trample or graze down native plants, creating an unnatural amount and type of disturbance that riparian species have not evolved to tolerate. Livestock grazing has been shown to reduce areal cover of native plant species, create disturbance frequencies that favor exotic annual weeds, and alter plant community composition. For example, in an arid South African ecosystem, grazing was found to cause a reduction of grasses, sedges, and tree species and an increase in non-succulent shrubs.

On agricultural land, fencing off waterways and riparian restoration has been shown to improve water quality, though this is more effective at reducing pollution from surface runoff (such as from phosphorus) rather than contaminants such as nitrogen which reach the waterway by seeping through the soil. Fencing prevent stock from depositing feces directly into waterways and trampling the banks; planting reduces surface runoff. Trampling can increase erosion and decrease the filtration capacity of the soil, especially where animals create tracks, and fences can encourage the creation of tracks and wallows, creating a conduit for pollution that can overwhelm the effects of riparian restoration. One study of fencing a waterway on a deer farm reduced contaminants, including the indicator bacterium E. coli, by 55–84%, but nitrate concentrations doubled, and suspended sediment was increased from animals creating tracks along the fences.

==== Mining ====
Mining stream channels for sand and gravel can impact riparian zones by destroying habitat directly, removing groundwater through pumping, altering stream channel morphology, and changing sediment flow regimes. Conversely, mining activities in the floodplain can create favorable areas for the establishment of riparian vegetation (e.g., cottonwoods) along streams where natural recruitment processes have been impacted through other forms of human activity. Mining for metals can impact riparian zones when toxic materials accumulate in sediments.

==== Invasive exotics ====
The number and diversity of invasive exotic species in riparian ecosystems is increasing worldwide. Riparian zones may be particularly vulnerable to invasion due to frequent habitat disturbance (both natural and anthropogenic) and the efficiency of rivers and streams in dispersing propagules. Invasive species can greatly impact the ecosystem structure and function of riparian zones. For example, the higher biomass of dense stands of the invasive Acacia mearnsii and Eucalyptus species causes greater water consumption and thus lower water levels in streams in South Africa. Invasive plants can also cause changes in the amount of sediment that is trapped by vegetation, altering channel morphology, and can increase the flammability of the vegetation, increasing fire frequency. Exotic animals can also impact riparian zones. For example, feral burros along the Santa Maria river strip bark and cambium off native cottonwoods, causing tree mortality.

== Methods ==
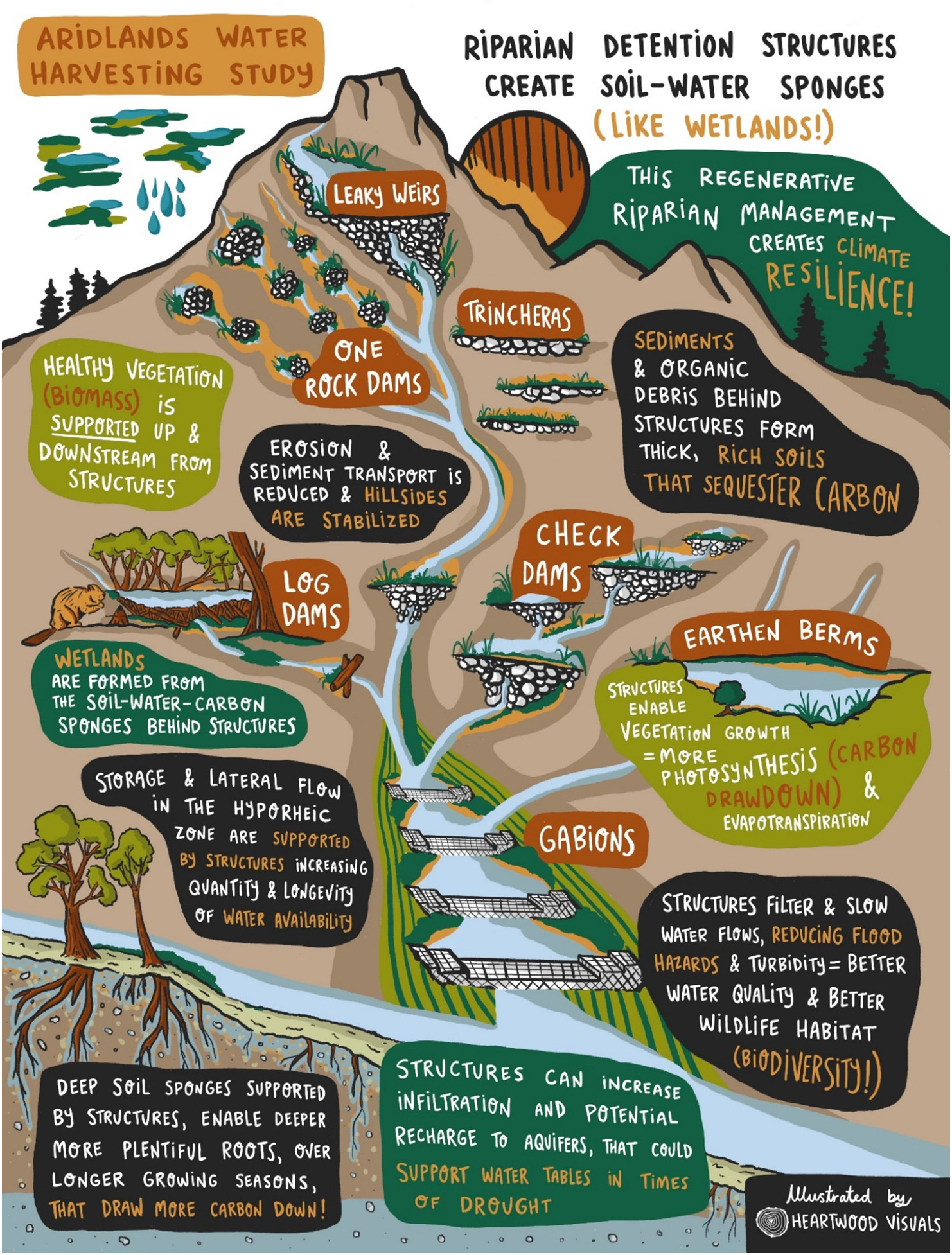
Natural Infrastructure in Dryland Streams (NIDS), which are structures naturally or anthropogenically created from earth, wood, debris, or rock that can restore implicit function of these systems

Methods for restoring riparian zones are often determined by the cause of degradation. Two main approaches are used in riparian-zone restoration: restoring hydrologic processes and geomorphic features, and reestablishing native riparian vegetation.

=== Restoring hydrologic processes and geomorphic features ===
When altered flow regimes have impacted riparian zone health, re-establishing natural streamflow may be the best solution to effectively restore riparian ecosystems. The complete removal of dams and flow-altering structures may be required to fully restore historic conditions, but this is not always realistic or feasible. An alternative to dam removal is for periodic flood pulses consistent with historical magnitude and timing to be simulated by releasing large amounts of water at once instead of maintaining more consistent flows throughout the year. This would allow overbank flooding, which is vital for maintaining the health of many riparian ecosystems. However, simply restoring a more natural flow regime also has logistical constraints, as legally appropriated water rights may not include the maintenance of such ecologically important factors. Reductions in groundwater pumping may also help restore riparian ecosystems by reestablishing groundwater levels that favor riparian vegetation; however, this too can be hampered by the fact that groundwater withdrawal regulations do not usually incorporate provisions for riparian protection.

The negative effects of channelization on stream and riparian health can be lessened through physical restoration of the stream channel. This can be accomplished by restoring flow to historic channels, or through the creation of new channels. In order for restoration to be successful, particularly for the creation of entirely new channels, restoration plans must take into account the geomorphic potential of the individual stream and tailor restoration methods accordingly. This is typically done through examination of reference streams (physically and ecologically similar streams in stable, natural condition) and by methods of stream classification based on morphological features. Stream channels are typically designed to be narrow enough to overflow into the floodplain on a 1.5 to 2 year timescale. The goal of geomorphic restoration is to eventually restore hydrologic processes important to riparian and instream ecosystems. However, this type of restoration can be logistically difficult: in many cases, the initial straightening or modification of the channel has resulted in humans encroaching into the former floodplain through development, agriculture, etc. In addition, stream channel modification can be extremely costly.

One well-known example of a large-scale stream restoration project is the Kissimmee River Restoration Project in central Florida. The Kissimmee River was channelized between 1962 and 1971 for flood control, turning a meandering 167 km (104 mi) of river into a 90 km (56 mi) drainage canal. This effectively eliminated seasonal inundation of the floodplain, causing a conversion from wetland to upland communities. A restoration plan began in 1999 with the goals of reestablishing ecological integrity of the river-floodplain system. The project involves dechannelizing major sections of the river, directing water into reconstructed channels, removing water control structures, and changing flow regimes to restore seasonal flooding to the floodplain. Since the completion of the first phase of restoration, a number of improvements in vegetation and wildlife communities have been documented as the conversion from uplands back to wetlands has begun to take place. Breaching levees to reconnect streams to their floodplains can be an effective form of restoration as well. On the Cosumnes River in central California, for example, the return of seasonal flooding to the floodplain as a result of levee breaching was found to result in the reestablishment of primarily native riparian plant communities.

Dechannelisation of shorter reach (2 km or 1.2 mi long) and lowered levee are also been proved to be an effective restoration approach together with natural (or near natural) flooding regime in order to improve soil processes spatial and temporal heterogeneity typical of natural floodplains

Stream channels will often recover from channelization without human intervention, provided that humans do not continue to maintain or modify the channel. Gradually, channel beds and stream banks will begin to accumulate sediment, meanders will form, and woody vegetation will take hold, stabilizing the banks. However, this process may take decades: a study found stream channel regeneration took approximately 65 years in channelized streams in West Tennessee. More active methods of restoration may speed the process along.

=== Restoration of riparian vegetation ===
The revegetation of degraded riparian zones is a common practice in riparian restoration. Revegetation can be accomplished through active or passive means, or a combination of the two.

==== Active vegetation restoration ====
A lack of naturally available propagules can be a major limiting factor in restoration success. Therefore, actively planting native vegetation is often crucial for the successful establishment of riparian species. Common methods for actively restoring vegetation include broadcast sowing seed and directly planting seeds, plugs, or seedlings. Reestablishing clonal species such as willows can often be accomplished by simply putting cuttings directly into the ground. To increase survival rates, young plants may need to be protected from herbivory with fencing or tree shelters. Preliminary research suggests that direct-seeding woody species may be more cost-effective than planting container stock.

Reference sites are often used to determine appropriate species to plant and may be used as sources for seeds or cuttings. Reference communities serve as models for what restoration sites should ideally look like after restoration is complete. Concerns about using reference sites have been raised however, as conditions at the restored and reference sites may not be similar enough to support the same species. Also, restored riparian zones may be able to support a variety of possible species combinations, therefore the Society for Ecological Restoration recommends using multiple reference sites to formulate restoration goals.

A practical question in active vegetation restoration is whether certain plants facilitate the recruitment and persistence of other plants (as predicted by theories of succession), or whether initial community composition determines long-term community composition (priority effects). If the former applies, it may be more effective to plant facilitative species first, and wait to plant dependent species as conditions become appropriate (e.g., when enough shade is provided by overstory species). If the latter applies, it is probably best to plant all desired species at the outset.

As a critical component of restoring native riparian communities, restoration practitioners often have to remove invasive species and prevent them from reestablishing. This can be accomplished through herbicide application, mechanical removal, etc. When restoration is to be done on long stretches of rivers and streams, it is often useful to begin the project upstream and work downstream so that propagules from exotic species upstream will not hamper restoration attempts. Ensuring the establishment of native species is considered vital in preventing future colonizations of exotic plants.

==== Passive vegetation restoration ====
Active planting of riparian vegetation may be the fastest way to reestablish riparian ecosystems, but methods may be prohibitively resource-intensive. Riparian vegetation may come back on its own if human-induced disturbances are stopped and/or hydrologic processes are restored. For example, many studies show that preventing cattle grazing in riparian zones through exclusion fencing can allow riparian vegetation to rapidly increase in robustness and cover, and also shift to a more natural community composition. By simply restoring hydrologic processes such as periodic flooding that favor riparian vegetation, native communities may regenerate on their own (e.g., the Cosumnes River floodplain). The successful recruitment of native species will depend on whether local or upstream seed sources can successfully disperse propagules to the restoration site, or whether a native seed bank is present. One potential hindrance to passive vegetation restoration is that exotic species may preferentially colonize the riparian zone. Active weeding may improve the chances that the desired native plant community will reestablish.

=== Restoring animal life ===
Restoration often focuses on reestablishing plant communities, probably because plants form the foundation for other organisms within the community. Restoration of faunal communities often follows the “Field of Dreams” hypothesis: “if you build it, they will come”. Many animal species have been found to naturally recolonize areas where habitat has been restored. For example, abundances of several bird species showed marked increases after riparian vegetation had been reestablished in a riparian corridor in Iowa. Some riparian restoration efforts may be aimed at conserving particular animal species of concern, such as the Valley elderberry longhorn beetle in central California, which is dependent on a riparian tree species (blue elderberry, Sambucus mexicana) as its sole host plant. When restoration efforts target key species, consideration for individual species’ needs (e.g., minimum width or extent of riparian vegetation) are important for ensuring restoration success.

=== Ecosystem perspectives ===
Restoration failures may occur when appropriate ecosystem conditions are not reestablished, such as soil characteristics (e.g., salinity, pH, beneficial soil biota, etc.), surface water and groundwater levels, and flow regimes. Therefore, successful restoration may be dependent on taking a number of both biotic and abiotic factors into account. For example, restoration of soil biota, including symbiotic myccorhizae, invertebrates, and microorganisms may improve nutrient cycling dynamics. Restoration of physical processes may be a prerequisite to the reestablishment of healthy riparian communities. Ultimately, a combination of approaches taking into account causes for degradation and targeting both hydrology and the reestablishment of vegetation and other life forms may be most effective in riparian zone restoration.

== See also ==
- Buffer strip
- Canebrake
- Constructed wetland
- Drainage system (agriculture)
- Environmental restoration
- Infiltration (hydrology)
- Land rehabilitation
- Limnology
- Restoration ecology
- Revetment
- Riprap
- Watertable control
