= Stream restoration =

Work to improve the environmental health of a river or stream

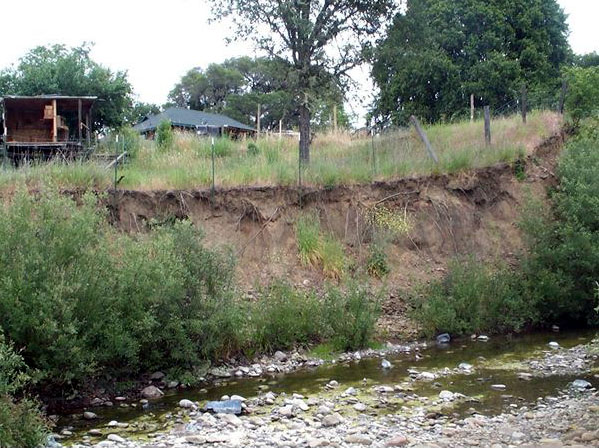
Robinson Creek in Boonville, California, had highly eroded stream banks prior to initiation of a stream restoration project.

Stream restoration or river restoration, also sometimes referred to as river reclamation, is work conducted to improve the environmental health of a river or stream, in support of biodiversity, recreation, flood management and/or landscape development.

Stream restoration approaches can be divided into two broad categories: form-based restoration, which relies on physical interventions in a stream to improve its conditions; and process-based restoration, which advocates the restoration of hydrological and geomorphological processes (such as sediment transport or connectivity between the channel and the floodplain) to ensure a stream's resilience and ecological health. Form-based restoration techniques include deflectors; cross-vanes; weirs, step-pools and other grade-control structures; engineered log jams; bank stabilization methods and other channel-reconfiguration efforts. These induce immediate change in a stream, but sometimes fail to achieve the desired effects if degradation originates at a wider scale. Process-based restoration includes restoring lateral or longitudinal connectivity of water and sediment fluxes and limiting interventions within a corridor defined based on the stream's hydrology and geomorphology. The beneficial effects of process-based restoration projects may sometimes take time to be felt since changes in the stream will occur at a pace that depends on the stream dynamics.

Despite the significant number of stream-restoration projects worldwide, the effectiveness of stream restoration remains poorly quantified, partly due to insufficient monitoring. However, in response to growing environmental awareness, stream-restoration requirements are increasingly adopted in legislation in different parts of the world.

== Definition, objectives and popularity ==
Stream restoration or river restoration, sometimes called river reclamation in the United Kingdom, is a set of activities that aim to improve the environmental health of a river or stream. These activities aim to restore rivers and streams to their original states or to a reference state, in support of biodiversity, recreation, flood management, landscape development, or a combination of these phenomena. Stream restoration is generally associated with environmental restoration and ecological restoration. In that sense, stream restoration differs from:

- river engineering, a term which typically refers to physical alterations of a water body, for purposes that include navigation, flood control or water supply diversion and are not necessarily related to ecological restoration;
- waterway restoration, a term used in the United Kingdom describing alterations to a canal or river to improve navigability and related recreational amenities.

Improved stream health may be indicated by expanded habitat for diverse species (e.g. fish, aquatic insects, other wildlife) and reduced stream bank erosion, although bank erosion is increasingly recognized as contributing to the ecological health of streams. Enhancements may also include improved water quality (i.e., reduction of pollutant levels and increase of dissolved oxygen levels) and achieving a self-sustaining, resilient stream system that does not require periodic human intervention, such as dredging or construction of flood or erosion control structures. Stream restoration projects can also yield increased property values in adjacent areas.

In the past decades, stream restoration has emerged as a significant discipline in the field of water-resources management, due to the degradation of many aquatic and riparian ecosystems related to human activities. In the U.S. alone, it was estimated in the early 2000s that more than one billion U.S. dollars were spent each year to restore rivers and that close to 40,000 restoration projects had been conducted in the continental part of the country.

== Restoration approaches and techniques ==
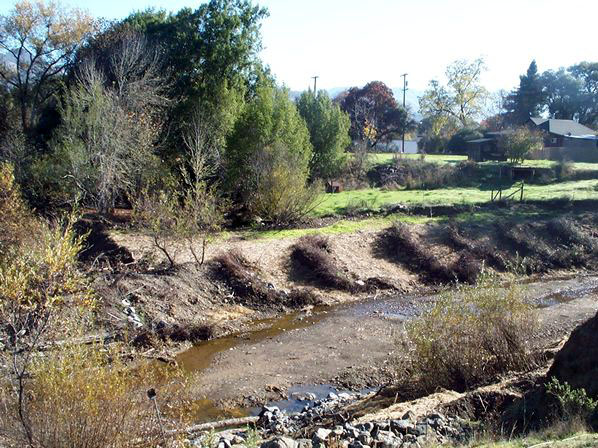
Robinson Creek restoration project (2005) included re-shaping of stream-bank slopes, addition of live willow plants and large, rock baffles, removal of invasive species and revegetation with indigenous species.

Stream restoration activities may range from the simple improvement or removal of a structure that inhibits natural stream functions (e.g. repairing or replacing a culvert, or removing barriers to fish passage such as weirs), to the stabilization of stream banks, or other interventions such as riparian zone restoration or the installation of stormwater-management facilities like constructed wetlands. The use of recycled water to augment stream flows that have been depleted as a result of human activities can also be considered a form of stream restoration. When present, navigation locks have a potential to be operated as vertical slot fishways to restore fish passage to some extent for a wide range of fish, including poor swimmers.

Stream-restoration projects normally begin with an assessment of a focal stream system, including climatic data, geology, watershed hydrology, stream hydraulics, sediment transport patterns, channel geometry, historical channel mobility, and flood records. Numerous systems exist to classify streams according to their geomorphology. This preliminary assessment helps to understand the stream dynamics and determining the cause of the observed degradation to be addressed; it can also be used to determine the target state for the intended restoration work, especially since the "natural" or undisturbed state is sometimes no longer achievable due to various constraints.

Two broad approaches to stream restoration have been defined in the past decades: form-based restoration and process-based restoration. Whereas the former focuses on the restoration of structural features and/or patterns considered to be characteristic of the target stream system, the latter is based on the restoration of hydrological and geomorphological processes (such as sediment transport or connectivity between the channel and the floodplain) to ensure a stream's resilience and ecological health.

=== Form-based restoration ===
Form-based stream restoration promotes the modification of a stream channel to improve stream conditions. Targeted outcomes can include improved water quality, enhanced fish habitat and abundance, as well as increased bank and channel stability. This approach is widely used worldwide, and is supported by various government agencies, including the United States Environmental Protection Agency (U.S. EPA).

Form-based restoration projects can be carried out at various scales, including the reach scale. They can include measures such as the installation of in-stream structures, bank stabilization and more significant channel reconfiguration efforts. Reconfiguration work may focus on channel shape (in terms of sinuosity and meander characteristics), cross-section or channel profile (slope along the channel bed). These alterations affect the dissipation of energy through a channel, which impacts flow velocity and turbulence, water-surface elevations, sediment transport, and scour, among other characteristics.

==== Installation of in-stream structures ====
===== Deflectors =====
Deflectors are generally wooden or rock structures installed at a bank toe and extending towards the center of a stream, in order to concentrate stream flow away from its banks. They can limit bank erosion and generate varying flow conditions in terms of depth and velocity, which can positively impact fish habitat.

===== Cross-vanes and related structures =====
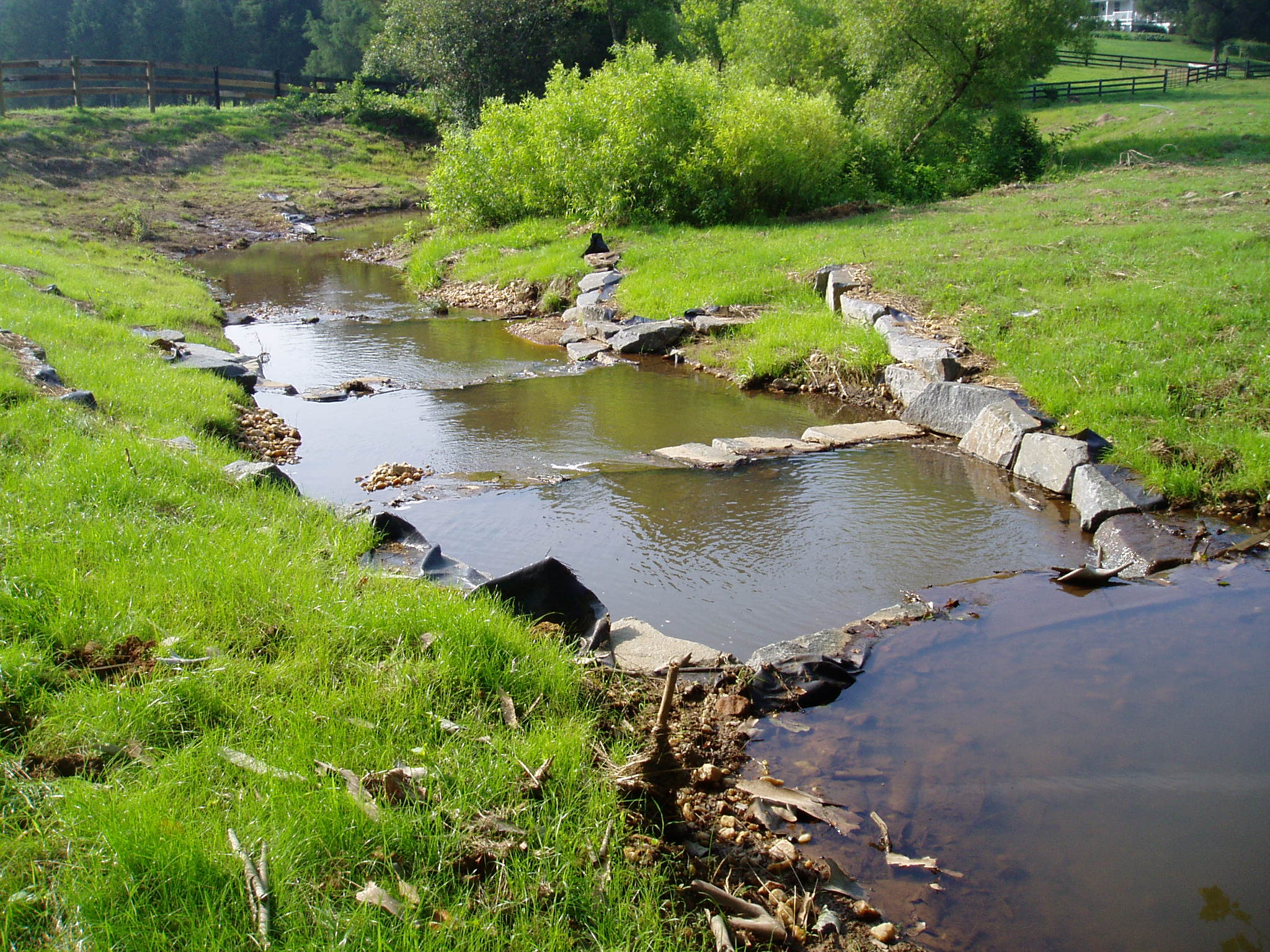
Cross-vanes

Cross-vanes are U-shaped structures made of boulders or logs, built across the channel to concentrate stream flow in the center of the channel and thereby reduce bank erosion. They do not impact channel capacity and provides other benefits such as improved habitat for aquatic species. Similar structures used to dissipate stream energy include the W-weirs and J-Hook vanes.

===== Weirs, step pools and grade-control structures =====
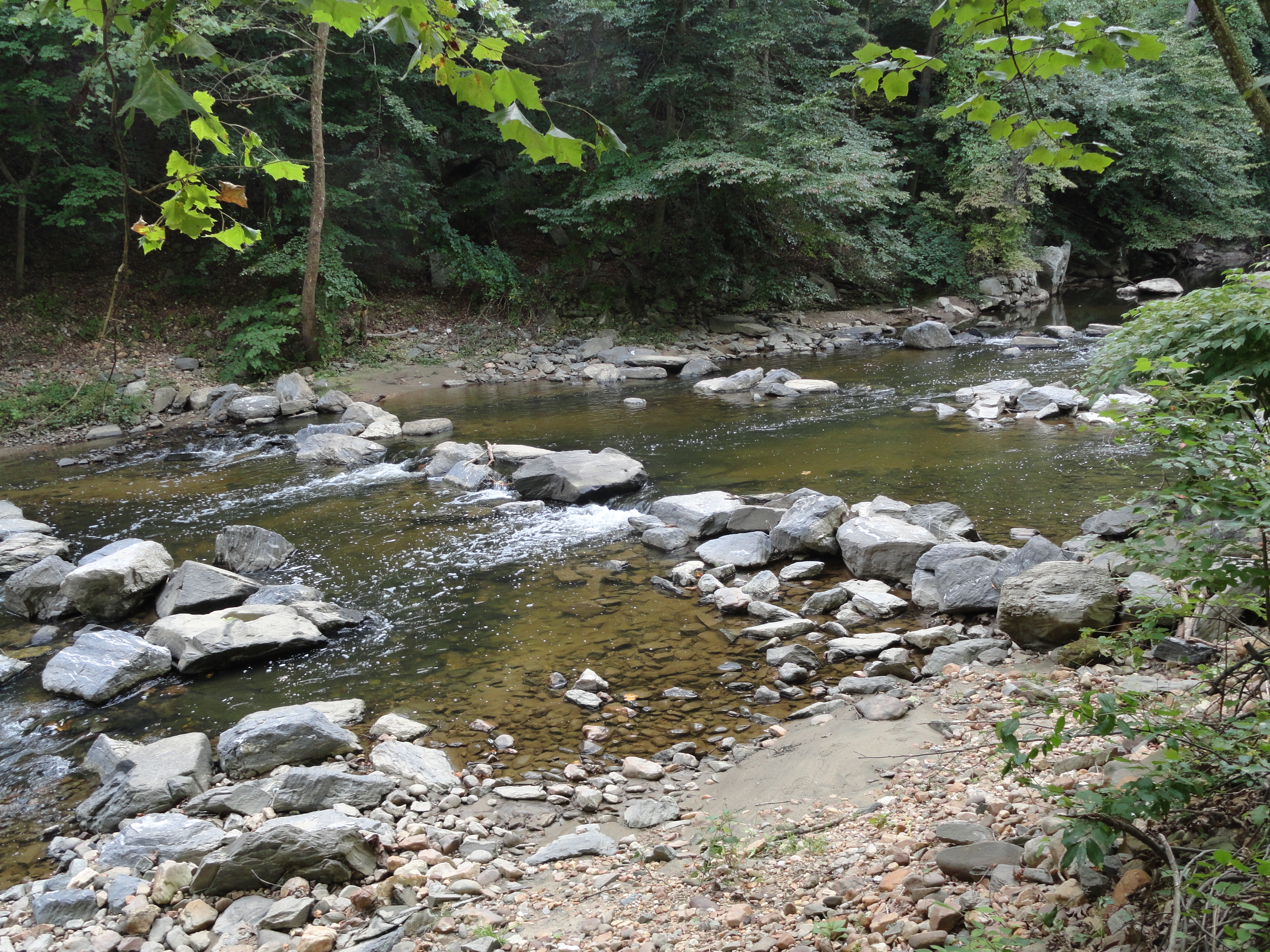
Boulder step pools installed in Rock Creek, Washington, D.C. The pools raise the water level and allow fish to swim over a partially-submerged sewer pipe which crosses the creek.

These structures, which can be built with rocks or wood (logs or woody debris), gradually lower the elevation of the stream and dissipate flow energy, thereby reducing flow velocity. They can help limit bed degradation. They generate water accumulation upstream from them and fast flowing conditions downstream from them, which can improve fish habitat. However, they can limit fish passage if they are too high.

===== Engineered log jams =====
An emerging stream restoration technique is the installation of engineered log jams. Because of channelization and removal of beaver dams and woody debris, many streams lack the hydraulic complexity that is necessary to maintain bank stabilization and healthy aquatic habitats. Reintroduction of large woody debris into streams is a method that is being experimented in streams such as Lagunitas Creek in Marin County, California and Thornton Creek, in Seattle, Washington. Log jams add diversity to the water flow by creating riffles, pools, and temperature variations. Large wood pieces, both living and dead, play an important role in the long-term stability of engineered log jams. However, individual pieces of wood in log jams are rarely stable over long periods and are naturally transported downstream, where they can get trapped in further log jams, other stream features or human infrastructures, which can generate nuisances for human use.

==== Bank stabilization ====
Bank stabilization is a common objective for stream-restoration projects, although bank erosion is generally viewed as favorable for the sustainability and diversity of aquatic and riparian habitats. This technique may be employed where a stream reach is highly confined, or where infrastructure is threatened.

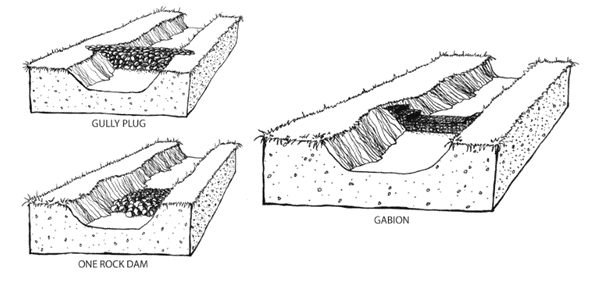
One-rock dams (trincheras), check dams (aka gully plugs), and gabions are examples of erosion control structures, rock detention structures, or natural infrastructure suitable for use restoration of streams or riparian zones; these structures are particularly useful in dryland biomes

Bank stabilization is achieved through the installation of riprap, gabions or through the use of revegetation and/or bioengineering methods, which relies on the use of live plants to build bank stabilizing structures. As new plants sprout from the live branches, the roots anchor the soil and prevent erosion. This makes bioengineering structures more natural and more adaptable to evolving conditions than "hard" engineering structures. Bioengineering structures include fascines, brush mattresses, brush layer, and vegetated geogrids.

==== Other channel-reconfiguration techniques ====
Channel reconfiguration involves the physical modification of the stream. Depending on the scale of a project, a channel's cross-section can be modified, and meanders can be constructed through earthworks to achieve the target stream morphology. In the U.S., such work is frequently based on the Natural Channel Design (NCD), a method developed in the 1990s. This method involves a classification of the stream to be restored based on parameters such as channel pattern and geometry, topography, slope, and bed material. This classification is followed by a design phase based on the NCD method, which includes 8 phases and 40 steps. The method relies on the construction of the desired morphology, and its stabilization with natural materials such as boulders and vegetation to limit erosion and channel mobility.

==== Criticisms to form-based restoration ====
Despite its popularity, form-based restoration has been criticized by the scientific community. Common criticisms are that the scale at which form-based restoration is often much smaller than the spatial and temporal scales of the processes that cause the observed problems and that the target state is frequently influenced by the social conception of what a stream should look like and does not necessarily take into account the stream's geomorphological context (e.g., meandering rivers tend to be viewed as more "natural" and more beautiful, whereas local conditions sometimes favour other patterns such as braided rivers). Numerous criticisms have also been directed at the NCD method by fluvial geomorphologists, who claim that the method is a "cookbook" approach sometimes used by practitioners that do not have sufficient knowledge of fluvial geomorphology, resulting in project failures. Another criticism is the importance given to channel stability in the NCD method (and with some other form-based restoration methods), which can limit the streams' alluvial dynamics and adaptability to evolving conditions. The NCD method has been criticized for its improper application in the Washington, D.C. area to small-order, interior-forested, upper-headwater streams and wetlands, leading to loss of natural forest ecosystems.

=== Process-based restoration ===
Contrary to form-based restoration, which consists of improving a stream's conditions by modifying its structure, process-based restoration focuses on restoring the hydrological and geomorphological processes (or functions) that contribute to the stream's alluvial and ecological dynamics. This type of stream restoration has gained in popularity since the mid-1990s, as a more ecosystem-centered approach. Process-based restoration includes restoring lateral connectivity (between the stream and its floodplain), longitudinal connectivity (along the stream) and water and/or sediment fluxes, which might be impacted by hydro-power dams, grade control structures, erosion control structures and flood protection structures. Valley Floor Resetting epitomises process-based restoration by infilling the river channel and allowing the stream to carve its anastomosed channel anew, matching 'Stage Zero' on the Stream Evolution Model. In general, process-based restoration aims to maximize the resilience of the system and minimize maintenance requirements. In some instances, form-based restoration methods might be coupled with process-based restoration to restore key structures and achieve quicker results while waiting for restored processes to ensure adequate conditions in the long term.

==== Improving connectivity ====
The connectivity of streams to their adjacent floodplain along their entire length plays an important role in the equilibrium of the river system. Streams are shaped by the water and sediment fluxes from their watershed, and any alteration of these fluxes (either in quantity, intensity or timing) will result in changes in equilibrium planform and cross-sectional geometry, as well as modifications of the aquatic and riparian ecosystem. Removal or modification of levees can allow a better connection between streams and their floodplain. Similarly, removing dams and grade control structures can restore water and sediment fluxes and result in more diversified habitats, although impacts on fish communities can be difficult to assess.

In streams where existing infrastructures cannot be removed or modified, it is also possible to optimize sediment and water management in order to maximize connectivity and achieve flow patterns that ensure minimum ecosystem requirements. This can include releases from dams, but also delaying and/or treating water from agricultural and urban sources.

==== Implementing a minimum stream corridor width ====
Another method of ensuring the ecological health of streams while limiting impacts on human infrastructures is to delineate a corridor within which the stream is expected to migrate over time. This method is based on the concept of minimum intervention within this corridor, whose limits should be determined based on the stream's hydrology and geomorphology. Although this concept is often restricted to the lateral mobility of streams (related to bank erosion), some systems also integrate the space necessary for floods of various return periods. This concept has been developed and adapted in various countries around the world, resulting in the notion of "stream corridor" or "river corridor" in the U.S., "room for the river" in the Netherlands, "espace de liberté" ("freedom space") in France (where the concept of "erodible corridor" is also used) and Québec (Canada), "espace réservé aux eaux" ("space reserved for water(courses)") in Switzerland, "fascia di pertinenza fluviale" in Italy, "fluvial territory" in Spain and "making space for water" in the United Kingdom. A cost-benefit analysis has shown that this approach could be beneficial in the long term due to lower stream stabilization and maintenance costs, lower damages resulting from erosion and flooding, and ecological services rendered by the restored streams. However, this approach cannot be implemented alone if watershed-scale stressors contribute to stream degradation.

=== Additional practices ===
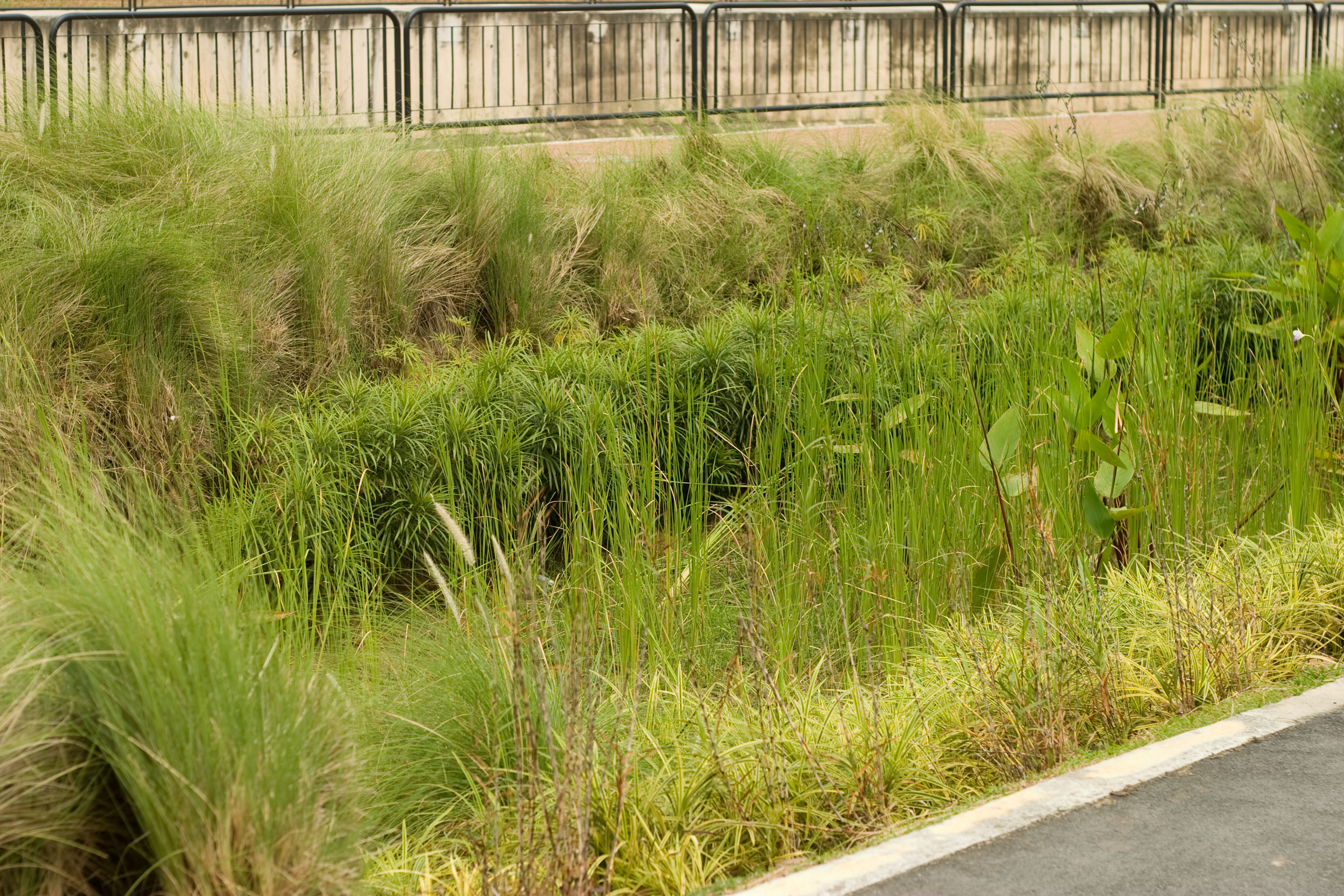
A rain garden in Singapore

In addition to the aforementioned restoration approaches and methods, additional measures can be implemented if stream degradation factors occur at the watershed scale. First, high-quality areas should also be protected. Additional measures include revegetation/reforestation efforts (ideally with native species); the adoption of agricultural best management practices that minimize erosion and runoff; adequate treatment of sewage water and industrial discharge across the watershed; and improved stormwater management to delay/minimize the transport of water to the stream and minimize pollutant migration. Alternative stormwater management facilities include the following options:

- Bioretention systems and rain gardens
- Constructed wetlands
- Infiltration basins
- Retention basins

== Effectiveness of stream restoration projects ==
In the 2000s, a study of stream restoration efforts in the U.S. led to the creation of the National River Restoration Science Synthesis (NRRSS) database, which included information on over 35,000 stream restoration projects carried out in the U.S. Synthesizing efforts are also carried out in other parts of the world, such as Europe. However, despite the large number of stream restoration projects carried out each year worldwide, the effectiveness of stream restoration projects remains poorly quantified. This situation appears to result from limited data on the restored streams' biophysical and geochemical contexts, to insufficient post-monitoring work and to the varying metrics used to evaluate project effectiveness. Depending on the objectives of the restoration project, the goals (restoration of fish populations, of alluvial dynamics, etc.) may take considerable time to be fully achieved. Therefore, whereas monitoring efforts should be proportional to the scale of the situation to be addressed, long-term is often necessary in order to fully evaluate a project's effectiveness.

In general, project effectiveness has been found to be dependent on selection of an appropriate restoration method considering the nature, cause and scale of the degradation problem. As such, reach-scale projects generally fail at restoring conditions whose root cause lies at the watershed scale, such as water quality issues. Furthermore, project failures have sometimes been attributed to design based on insufficient scientific bases; in some cases, restoration techniques may have been selected mainly for aesthetic reasons. Additional factors that can influence the effectiveness of river restoration projects include the selection of sites to be restored (for example, sites located near undisturbed reaches could be recolonized more effectively) and the amount of tree cutting and other destructive work necessary to carry out the restoration work (which can have long-lasting detrimental effects on the quality of the habitat). Although often viewed as a challenge, public involvement is generally considered to be a positive factor for the long-term success of stream restoration projects.

== Introduction in legislation ==
Stream restoration is gradually being introduced in the legislative framework of various states. Examples include the European water framework's commitment to restoring surface water bodies, the adoption of the concept of freedom space in the French legislation, the inclusion in the Swiss legislation of the notion of space reserved for watercourses and of the requirement to restore streams to a state close to their natural state, and the inclusion of river corridors in land use planning in the American states of Vermont and Washington. Although this evolution is generally viewed positively by the scientific community, a concern expressed by some is that it could lead to less flexibility and less room for innovation in a field that is still in development.

== Informational resources ==
The River Restoration Centre, based at Cranfield University, is responsible for the National River Restoration Inventory, which is used to document best practice in river watercourse and floodplain restoration, enhancement and management efforts in the United Kingdom. Other established sources for information on stream restoration include the NRRSS in the U.S. and the European Centre for River Restoration (ECRR), which holds details of projects across Europe. ECRR and the LIFE+ RESTORE project have developed a wiki-based inventory of river restoration case studies.

== See also ==
- Daylighting (streams)
- Environmental restoration
- Land rehabilitation
- Retrofit (environmental management)
- Restoration ecology
- Riparian zone restoration
- Subterranean river
