= Bar (river morphology) =

Elevated region of sediment in a river that has been deposited by the flow

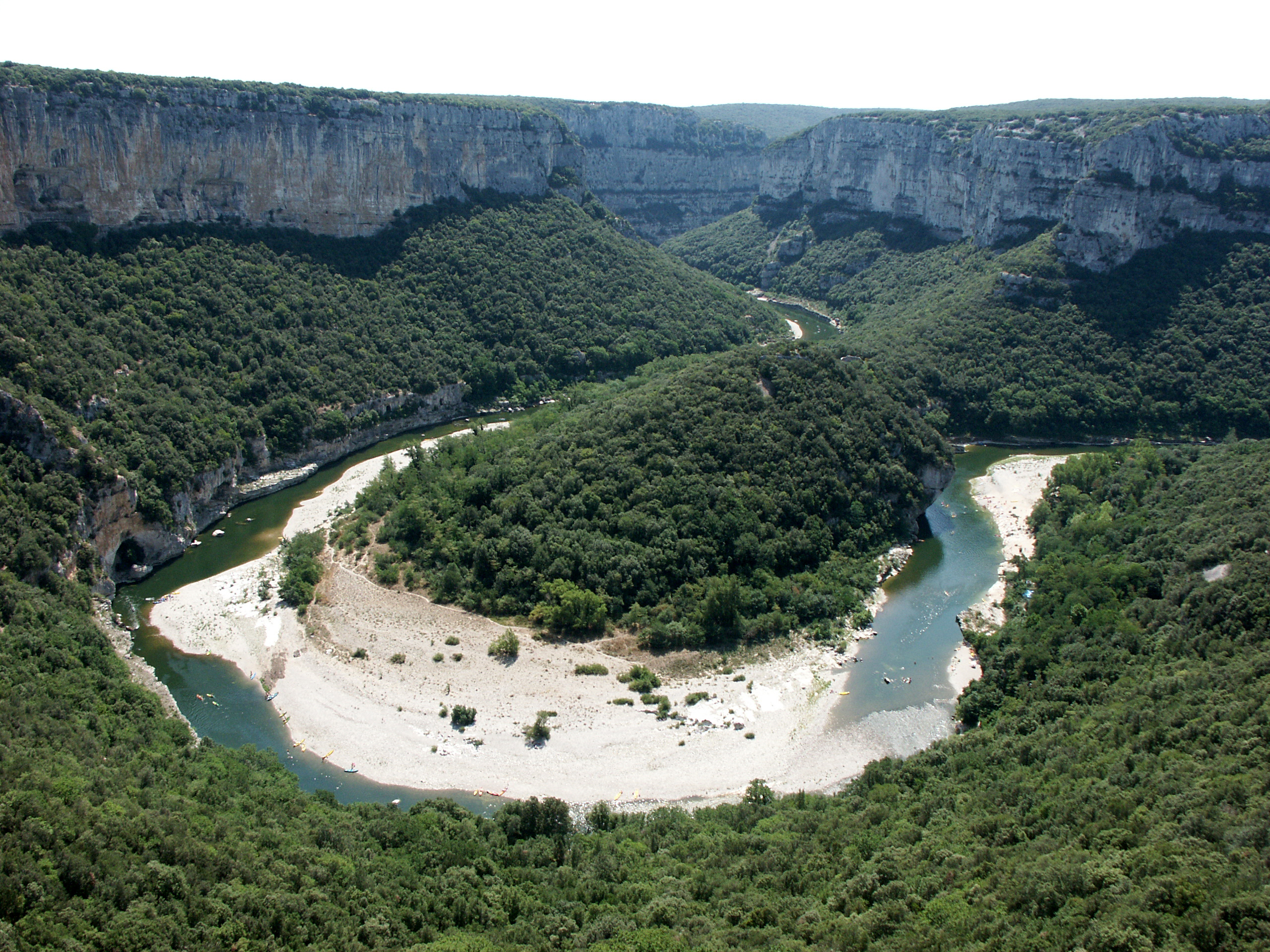
Point bar at a river meander: the Cirque de la Madeleine in the Gorges de l'Ardèche, France.

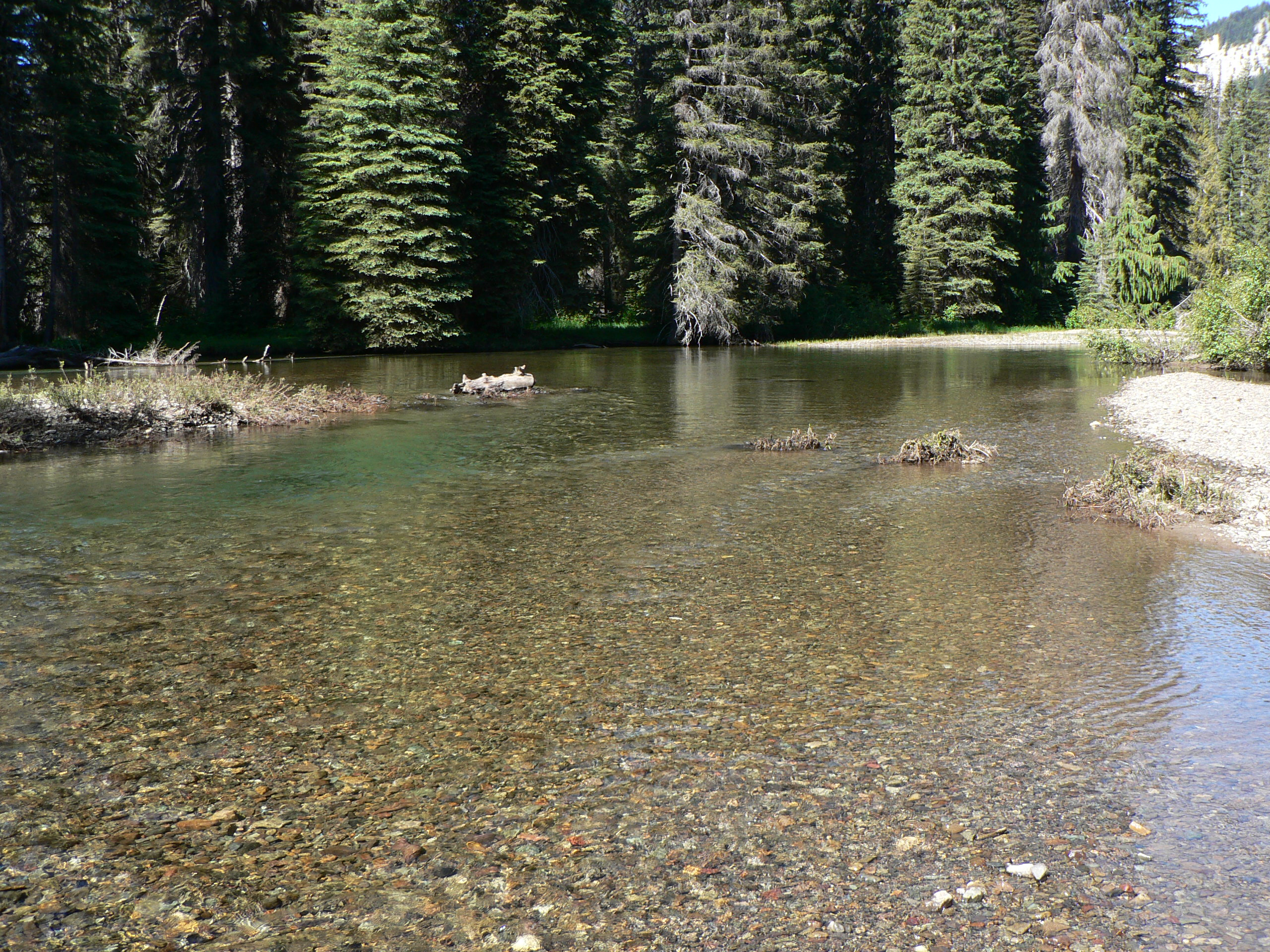
Gravel bar in the American River, Washington, United States.

A bar in a river is an elevated region of sediment (such as sand or gravel) that has been deposited by the flow. Types of bars include mid-channel bars (also called braid bars and common in braided rivers), point bars (common in meandering rivers), and mouth bars (common in river deltas). The locations of bars are determined by the geometry of the river and the flow through it. Bars reflect sediment supply conditions, and can show where sediment supply rate is greater than the transport capacity.

== Mid-channel bars ==
A mid-channel bar is also often referred to as a braid bar because they are often found in braided river channels. Braided river channels are broad and shallow and found in areas where sediment is easily eroded like at a glacial outwash, or at a mountain front with high sediment loads. These types of river systems are associated with high slope, sediment supply, stream power, shear stress, and bed load transport rates. Braided rivers have complex and unpredictable channel patterns, and sediment size tends to vary among streams. It is these features that are responsible for the formations of braid bars. Braided streams are often overfed with massive amounts of sediment which creates multiple stream channels within one dominant pair of flood bank plains. These channels are separated by mid-channel or braid bars. Anastomosing river channels also create mid-channel bars, however they are typically vegetated bars, making them more permanent than the bars found in a braided river channel which have high rates of change because of the large amounts of non-cohesive sediment, lack of vegetation, and high stream powers found in braided river channels.

Bars can also form mid-channel due to snags or logjams. For example, if a stable log is deposited mid-channel in a stream, this obstructs the flow and creates local flow convergence and divergence. This causes erosion on the upstream side of the obstruction and deposition on the downstream side. The deposition that occurs on the downstream side can create a central bar, and an arcuate bar can be formed as flow diverges upstream of the obstruction. Continuous deposition downstream can build up the central bar to form an island. Eventually the logjam can become partially buried, which protects the island from erosion, allowing for vegetation to begin to grow, and stabilize the area even further. Over time, the bar can eventually attach to one side of the channel bank and merge into the flood plain.

== Point bars ==
A point bar is an area of deposition typically found in meandering rivers. Point bars form on the inside of meander bends in meandering rivers. As the flow moves around the inside of the bend in the river, the water slows down because of the shallow flow and low shear stresses there reduce the amount of material that can be carried there. Point bars are usually crescent shaped and located on the inside curve of the river bend. The excess material falls out of transport and, over time, forms a point bar. Point bars are typically found in the slowest moving, shallowest parts of rivers and streams, and are often parallel to the shore and occupy the area farthest from the thalweg, on the outside curve of the river bend in a meandering river. Here, at the deepest and fastest part of the stream is the cut bank, the area of a meandering river channel that continuously undergoes erosion. The faster the water in a river channel, the better it is able to pick up greater amounts of sediment, and larger pieces of sediment, which increases the river's bed load. Over a long enough period of time, the combination of deposition along point bars, and erosion along cut banks can lead to the formation of an oxbow lake.

== Mouth bars ==
A mouth bar is an elevated region of sediment typically found at a river delta which is located at the mouth of a river where the river flows out to the ocean. Sediment is transported by the river and deposited, mid channel, at the mouth of the river. This occurs because, as the river widens at the mouth, the flow slows, and sediment settles out and is deposited. After initial formation of a river mouth bar, they have the tendency to prograde. This is caused by the pressure from the flow on the upstream face of the bar. This pressure creates erosion on that face of the bar, allowing the flow to transport this sediment over or around, and re-deposit it farther downstream, closer to the ocean. River mouth bars stagnate, or cease to prograde when the water depth above the flow is shallow enough to create a pressure on the upstream side of the bar strong enough to force the flow around the deposit rather than over the top of the bar. This divergent channel flow around either side of the sediment deposit continuously transports sediment, which over time is deposited on either side of this original mid channel deposit. As more and more sediment accumulates across the mouth of the river, it builds up to eventually create a sand bar that has the potential to extend the entire length of the river mouth and block the flow.

== See also ==
- Pendant bar – fluvial landform formed on the downstream side of a weathering-resistant protrusion
- River island – Exposed landmass within a river
