= Laurel Larsen =

Professor of civil and environmental engineering

Laurel G. Larsen
- Education: PhD University of Colorado M.A. Washington University in St. Louis B.S. Washington University in St. Louis
- Awards: 2018, Donath Medal (Young Scientist Award), Geological Society of America 2015, Hellman Faculty Fellow award, UC Berkeley 2015, NSF CAREER award 2013, Kohout Early Career Award, Geological Society of America Hydrogeology Division
- Scientific career
- Fields: Hydroecology, Geomorphology, Environmental Modeling, Complex Systems
- Workplaces: University of California, Berkeley, 2013–present; USGS National Research Program, Reston, Virginia, 2008–2016
- Thesis: Hydroecological Feedback Processes Governing Landscape Self-Organization in the Florida Everglades

Laurel G. Larsen is an associate professor in Hydrology at Department of Earth Sciences at Uppsala University. She was former associate professor of earth systems science for the Department of Geography and Civil and Environmental Engineering at the University of California, Berkeley where she also heads the Environmental Systems Dynamics Laboratory. Her areas of expertise include hydroecology, geomorphology, complex systems, and environmental modeling.

== Early life and education ==
Larsen spent much of her childhood playing in and around water in Florida. Her parents both worked in science, as a NASA shuttle engineer and a state water manager. At the age of 16, Larsen began her undergraduate studies at Washington University in St. Louis where she eventually graduated summa cum laude with majors in environmental studies and systems science and mathematics. She then proceeded to complete her master's degree in earth and planetary sciences at the same institution under Ray Arvidson's mentorship. Larsen's master's thesis is titled Development and Testing of a Coupled Heat and Moisture Transfer Model to Assess Subsurface Moisture Gradients and was completed in 2003.

Larsen moved on to the University of Colorado Boulder at age 21 and began her doctoral studies in the Civil, Environmental, and Architectural Engineering department. At the University of Colorado Boulder, Larsen studied fluvial geomorphology, aquatic ecology, and fluid mechanics. She began researching the Florida Everglades and how they evolved to create the unique slough and ridge landscape that is essential to the Everglades ecosystem. In 2008, she completed her dissertation on Hydroecological Feedback Processes Governing Landscape Self-Organization in the Florida Everglades.

== Career and research ==
Laurel Larsen has worked in academia since she earned her PhD at the University of Colorado Boulder in 2008. She began her professional research with the United States Geological Survey National Research Program as part of the Hydroecology of Flowing Waters Project. She continued working with the United States Geological Survey National Research Program until 2016 on various other research topics. Some of this research included work on the differences between the hydrogeomorphology of restored and unrestored streams within the Chesapeake Bay watershed and what kind of impacts restoration can have on the surrounding ecosystem.

Larsen was hired at the University of California, Berkeley as an assistant professor for the Department of Geography in 2013. In 2018, she was made an associate professor for the Geography and Civil and Environmental engineering department at the University of California, Berkeley and currently holds this position.

Larsen's research focuses on the fields of hydrology, geomorphology, environmental fluid mechanics, complex systems, environmental modeling, aquatic ecology, restoration ecology, wetlands, sediment transport. She is most known for her achievements in research on the Florida Everglades which have influenced numerous restoration efforts in the area. The Florida Everglades have a unique ecosystem composed of ridges with more vegetation and sloughs with less vegetation. Water flows through the entire ecosystem parallel to these "ridge-and-slough" structures providing essential services to the ecosystem; however, human impacts have disrupted the flow of water through the Everglades. Larsen's research has answered questions about the formation of this landscape that were previously considered unanswerable and her research has been able to dictate decisions on how to best restore the natural landscape from anthropogenic changes.

== Awards and honors ==
Some of Larsen's most recent awards include:

- 2018, Donath Medal (Young Scientist Award), Geological Society of America
- 2015, Hellman Faculty Fellow award, UC Berkeley
- 2015, NSF CAREER award
- 2013, Kohout Early Career Award, Geological Society of America Hydrogeology Division

== Publications ==
Larsen has authored or co-authored over 100 published scientific papers and has been cited over 1200 times. Her most notable publications focus on the formation of aquatic landscapes such as the Florida Everglades and strategies for restoration of these spaces. These topics were previously considered untestable due to the large difference in timescales between the forces forming these landscapes (i.e. hydraulic transport) and the resulting changes in geomorphic and biological evolution. Larsen has been able to quantify and evaluate these systems using mathematical models that consider hydraulic transport on the scale of seconds to months and geomorphology and biology over the course of decades and centuries.

Larsen has also published a picture book called "One Night in the Everglades" in conjunction with the Long Term ecological Research Network, an organization funded by the National Science Foundation.

== Personal life ==
Larsen seemingly enjoys hiking and racing bicycles, both cyclocross and road cycling. Larsen appears interested in cooking and food philosophy as well as claiming artistic ventures such as poetry, guitar, dancing, and visual art.
