= Pendant (disambiguation) =

A pendant is a piece of jewellery.

Pendant may also refer to:

== Ships and aircraft ==
- Arresting gear, which use deck pendant cables to rapidly decelerate an aircraft as it lands on an aircraft carrier
- Nautical pendant, a length of cable or rope with eyes or fittings at the ends for attachment to vessels, bollards or buoys
- Pennant number, previously called a pendant number, a British Navy and Commonwealth system for classifying warships
- Pennon (or pennant), a narrow, tapering flag commonly flown by ships at sea:
  - Pennant (commissioning), the traditional sign of a warship, flown from its masthead while the ship is in commission
  - Broad pennant, flown from the masthead of a Royal Navy ship to indicate the presence of a commodore on board
  - Pennant (church), flown by navies during services on board ships

== The arts ==
- Pendant (art), paintings, sculptures, or other works of art intended as a pair
- Pendant (musician), Brian Leeds (born 1991), American electronic musician
- Pendant vault, a late Gothic architecture vault

== Other uses ==
- Pendant bar, a fluvial landform
- Pendant group, a group of molecules attached to a backbone chain of a long molecule
- Pendant light, a type of light fixture
- Pendant vertex, a vertex whose neighbourhood contains exactly one vertex
- Roof pendant, in structural geology, a mass of country rock that projects downward into an igneous intrusion

== See also ==
- Pendent (the adjectival form)
