= Mouth bar =

River bar in middle of river mouth

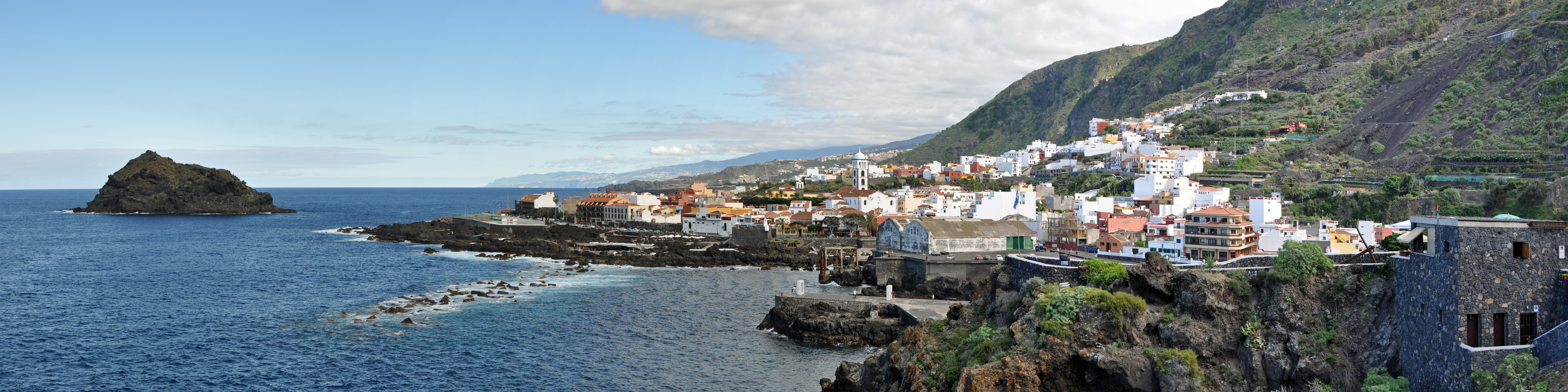
Garachico

A mouth bar is an element of a deltaic system, which refers to the typically mid-channel deposition of the sediment transported by the river channel at the river mouth.

== Formation mechanism ==
River mouth bars form because the cross-sectional area of the expanding sediment-laden outflow increases, and consequently, the sediment transport rate down the jet centerline decreases basinward as flow progresses from confined to unconfined. More specifically, four stages of the river mouth bar formation are: (1) Turbulent jet, expanding into a shallow and sloping basin, first creates parallel subaqueous levees extending basinward and starting a river mouth bar basinward of the levee tips due to the decrease in jet momentum flux and resulting the high sedimentation rate in this region; (2) The subaqueous levees extend basinward and the river mouth bar aggrades and progrades since its presence causes flow acceleration on streamlines over the bar, and subsequently, this acceleration changes the sediment transport gradient over the bar triggering erosion on the upstream bar face and deposition in the downstream bar wake; (3) River mouth bar progradation stops and it stagnates when depth over the bar is shallow enough to create a fluid pressure on the upstream side of the bar forcing flow around the bar, and consequently decreasing velocity and shear stress over the bar top; (4) Finally, as the levees continue to grow and spread due to the presence of the bar, increased water and sediment discharges around the bar cause widening and creation of a classic triangular river mouth bar in plan view.

== Controls on mouth bar evolution ==
Sediment erosion and deposition dynamics in estuarine region, consequently the formation and growth of mouth bars, are affected by several natural and artificial factors. Human activities, such as reservoir construction, large-scale reclamation and embankment construction completely disturb the hydrodynamic balance of the system and permanently interfere with the morphology of mouth bars. Moreover, hydrodynamic factors such as water runoff, discharge fluctuations of the rivers, i.e., non-uniform flow conditions linked to the river hydrograph, sediment flux, sediment characteristics, river mouth geometry, vegetation, existence of tides and waves, play a vital role in sediment erosion and deposition dynamics at river mouths and activate serious geomorphologic controls on mouth bar development.

Regarding sediment characteristics, mass and cohesiveness play important roles in river mouth bar evolution. Since coarser sediments are not well suspended by the jet, they are likely to deposit close to the river mouth and lead to mouth bar construction. On the other hand, since fine sediments are generally transported in a suspended form, they can be carried further and disperse widely, and most of the time, lead to levee construction. Moreover, sediment cohesion, and similarly vegetation, play a role in the morphology of river mouth deposits by enhancing the stabilization, consequently changing the hydraulic geometry of the mouth and altering the hydrodynamics of the jet. Grain size, which controls the settling velocity of the particles, also influences the location of the river mouth bar basinward of the outlet. In addition, model results recently suggest that river channel width, depth, outflow velocity, and basin slope are the most important variables influencing distance to the river mouth bar.

In addition to the controls related to fluvial processes, the effects of marine controls, such as wave activity and tides, on river mouths are significant on the mouth bar evolution. Waves have a double effect on mouth bar growth; while small and locally generated waves favor the bar formation by increasing the jet spreading, large, swell waves suppress bar development. The complex effects of tides, on the other hand, depend on the relative strength of river inertia with respect to the tidal energy. When tidal energy is much higher than the fluvial one, hydrodynamics of the jet exiting the river mouth, dominating the sediment deposition, are highly affected. Continuously altered tidal wave velocity, width of spreading jet, water depth, and therefore, bottom friction throughout the tidal cycle, cause the development of distinct mouth bar morphologies. River discharge, tides and waves can also simultaneously affect the outflow dynamics depending on buoyancy, which play an important role on the evolution of mouth bars.

== Importance of mouth bars ==
When a river-dominated delta is considered, formation and evolution of terminal distributary channels of the delta, which are the most active parts of the distributive channel network, are closely related to mouth bar formation. Bifurcation of the channel flow due to initial mouth bar formation forms new distributary channels and they extend as the mouth bar migrates. Lateral and upstream growth of mouth bar reduces the flow velocity and sediment flux, i.e., flow capacity to carry sediments, through that channel resulting in filling and abandonment of the terminal distributary channel. The active channel, where the flow is diverted into, bifurcates again, following formation of another mouth bar, and creates another unit of channels.

Moreover, river mouth bars are important hydrocarbon reservoirs, and have been widely interpreted in the geologic record. Analyses of the hydraulic and sedimentologic conditions of river mouth bar formation, progradation and aggradation, and prediction on their shape, size and spacing are incredibly valuable for reservoir prediction.

Eventually, in estuarine regions, there is a mutual interaction between morphology and flow dynamics. While mouth bar morphology is shaped and affected by flow and sediment dynamics or wave and current patterns, mouth bars also modify those dynamics and change the morphology of estuaries. Therefore, the understanding of mouth bar evolution is key for further and better quantification of the changes in river hydraulics and morphodynamics due to mouth bar existence.

== Different types ==
Mouth bars are categorized based on the primary forces dominating their formation: (1) outflow inertia, (2) turbulent bed friction, (3) effluent buoyancy, (4) wave-induced, and finally, (5) tidal forces.

=== Inertia-dominated river mouth bars ===
Processes linked to high outflow velocities at deep water outlet and dispersion of sediment due to turbulent jet produce narrow, elongated lunate bars with a flat or gently ascending back, which are also called as "Gilbert-type" mouth bars, commonly in deep-water areas of the delta.

=== Friction-dominated river mouth bars ===
Lateral spreading of turbulent jet enhanced by increasing frictional resistance in shallow inshore waters, also associated with high bed load, produces almost triangular "middle ground bar" in the mouth of the river causing the channel to bifurcate. As progradation continues, new bars develop at the mouths of the bifurcated channels and enhance basinward the delta growth. Mississippi Delta is composed of shallow-water friction-dominated types in the east (Northeast Pass).

=== Buoyancy-dominated river mouth bars ===
Dominance of buoyancy processes at the river mouth associated with strong outflow density stratification and fine-grained sediment load rather than bed load, produces laterally restricted, narrow radial bars with gently dipping slopes in shallow water areas of the delta. Mississippi delta is composed of widely separated buoyancy-dominated mouth bar types in the south (Southwest Pass and South Pass).

=== Wave-dominated river mouth bars ===
Powerful and persistent wave energy and corresponding processes such as wave reworking, refraction of outflow, mixing due to wave breaking, longshore and cross-shore dispersion of sediment generate regular, commonly sand-filled, crescentic bars located at short distances from the mouth. The shape and location of the mouth bar also changes with normal or oblique wave incidence.

=== Tide-dominated river mouth bars ===
The development of tidal-dominated river mouth bars highly depends on the bidirectional sediment transport by tidal currents causing significant upstream return of sediment into channel. Flood and ebb-dominated sediment transports generate a broad, discontinuous, radial mouth bar dominated by large tidal ridges separated by deep channels.

== Implications for estuarine management ==
River mouth bar evolution is extremely significant within the coastal landscape. Most of the time, they are subaqueous and inaccessible. However, after they emerge and their subaerial portion becomes visible, they evolve into deltaic islands. Consequently, by promoting land expansion, they restore artificially modified shorelines and mitigate coastal erosion, protect coastal communities, promote vegetation growth, provide habitat for rich and productive estuarine ecosystems, and potentially be utilized for farming, living and engineering. Moreover, mouth bar deposits offer a strategic location for the research projects regarding estuarine and delta restoration which makes them ideal for studying the effects of river sediment reduction and relative sea level rise and for estimating the evolution, including land loss and inundation, of the river deltas.

A serious example is the Mississippi River Delta where coastal wetlands are disappearing at a rate of approximately 1% of land per year. On the Mississippi Delta, in order to eliminate land loss and mitigate coastal erosion, artificial diversions, reconnecting river to the deltaic wetland, have been constructed. Essentially, these diversions are expected to generate mouth bars at downstream end. Therefore, the restoration plans and studies by many scientists and engineers aim ultimately to promote mouth bar deposition by strategically selecting diversion sites and diversion geometries, and consequently stabilizing jet, enhancing bottom friction and sediment trapping efficiencies. This example shows how extremely essential is to understand the dynamics of river mouth bars and the physics behind their formation for future discussions of new land development, estuary restoration, as well as mitigation measures for loss of deltaic wetlands.

== See also ==
- Braid bar
- Peresyp
- River island
