= Peresyp =

Russian name for the sandbar which forms an estuary lagoon

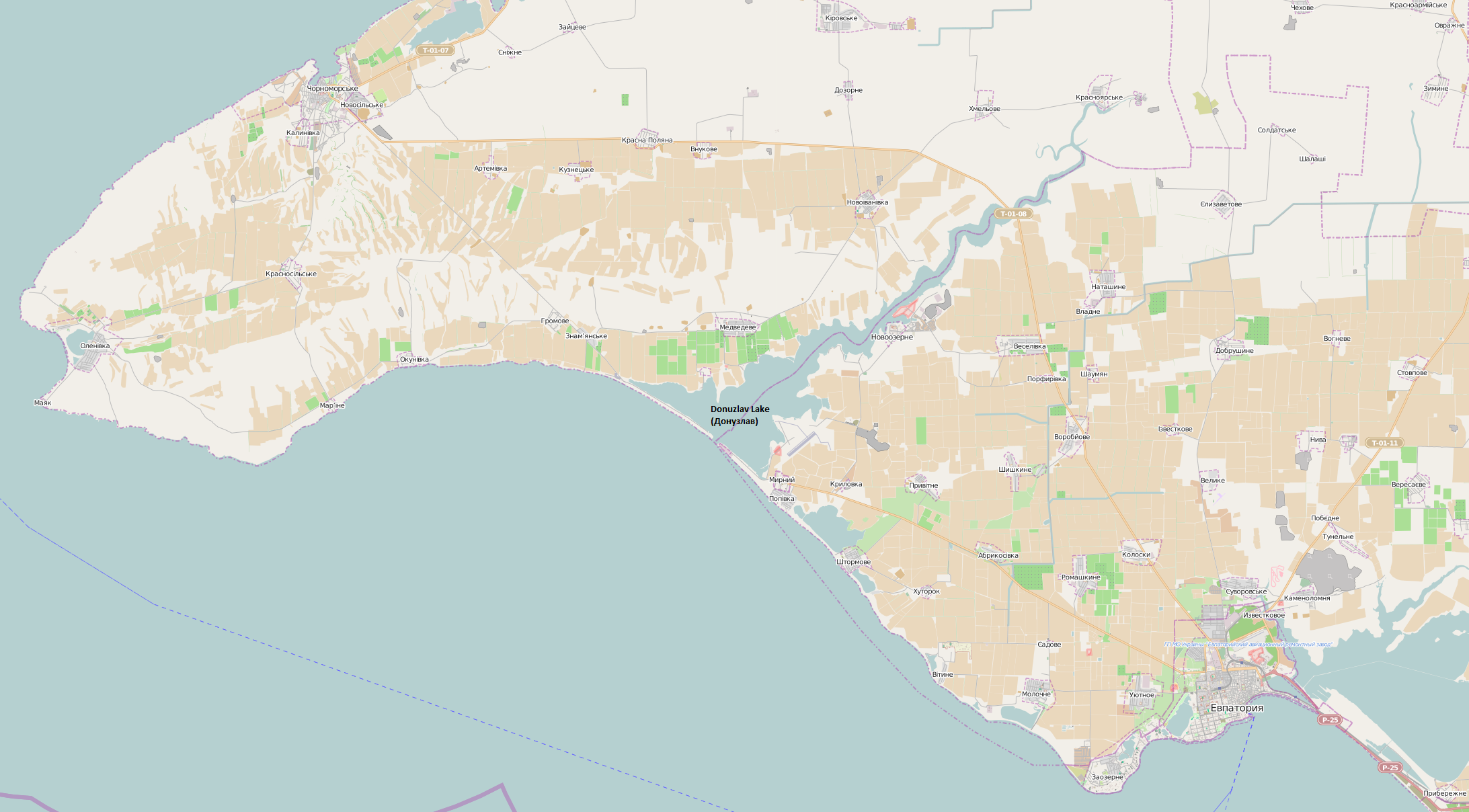
Donuzlav, Crimea, separated by a peresyp from the Black Sea

A peresyp (пересыпь), is a Russian hydrological term name for a mouth bar, an element of a deltaic system. A peresyp or mouth bar is a deposit of the sediment transported by the river—i.e., a shoal or sandbar—at the river mouth, typically in mid-channel. This narrow sandbar rises above the water level like a spit and separates a liman (a Russian word for any estuary lagoon on the Black Sea coast) from the open water.

Unlike a tombolo, a mouth bar/peresyp seldom forms a contiguous strip and instead usually has one or more channels (girlo (гирло) in Russian) that connect the lagoon/liman to the sea.

Like a spit, a peresyp is formed by actions of surf zone currents from sand, gravel/pebbles, and crushed shells as a result of longitudinal (longshore drift) or transverse transport of sediment. A peresyp may form when two spits on the two sides of a liman grow and meet. These channels can then close and re-open cyclically with changes in current and saturation. And water can seep through or spill over a closed peresyp. The seawater within the enclosed and shallow liman will then evaporate, raising the lagoon's salinity. A number of salt lakes in Crimea were formed this way.

A liman or peresyp is classified as "maritime" if formed by sea currents or "fluvial" if by deltaic action.

A number of locations on the Black Sea coasts of Russia and Ukraine are called peresyp. The Peresypskyi Raion (district) of Odesa is built on the wide mouth bar that separates the Khadzhibey and Kuialnyk estuaries from the Black Sea. Other sites include the Anapa Peresyp spit Tylihul Peresyp on the Tylihul Estuary in Ukraine.

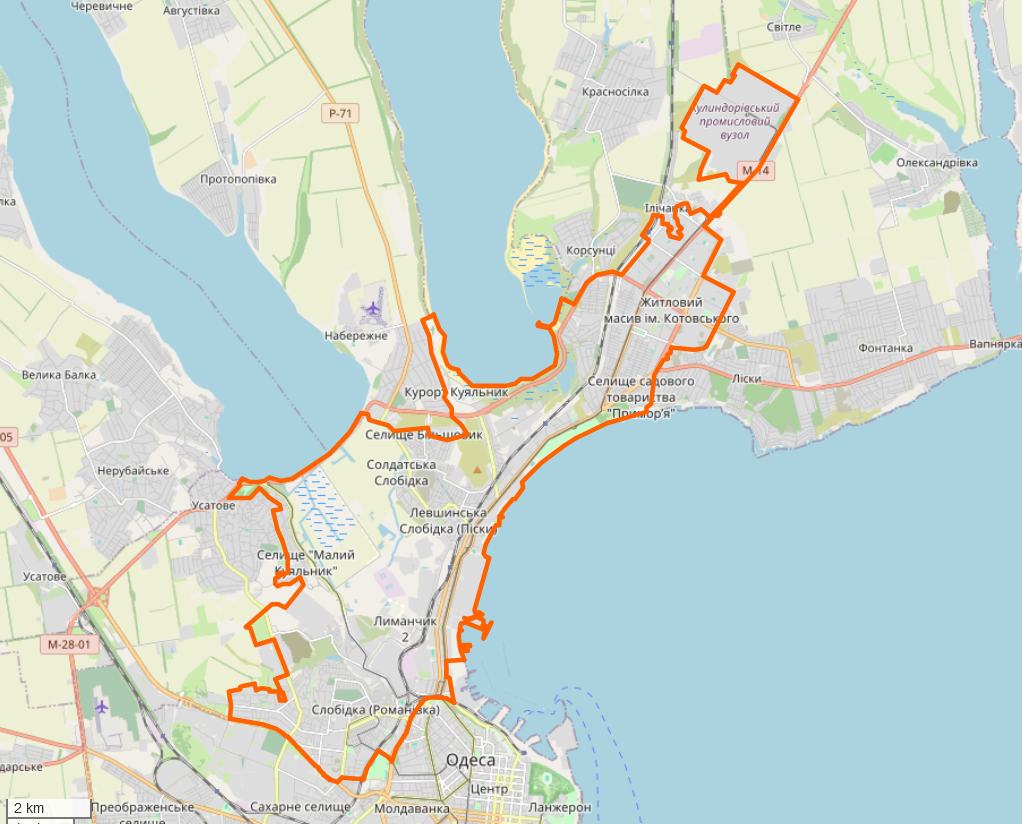
Peresypskyi Raion, Odesa

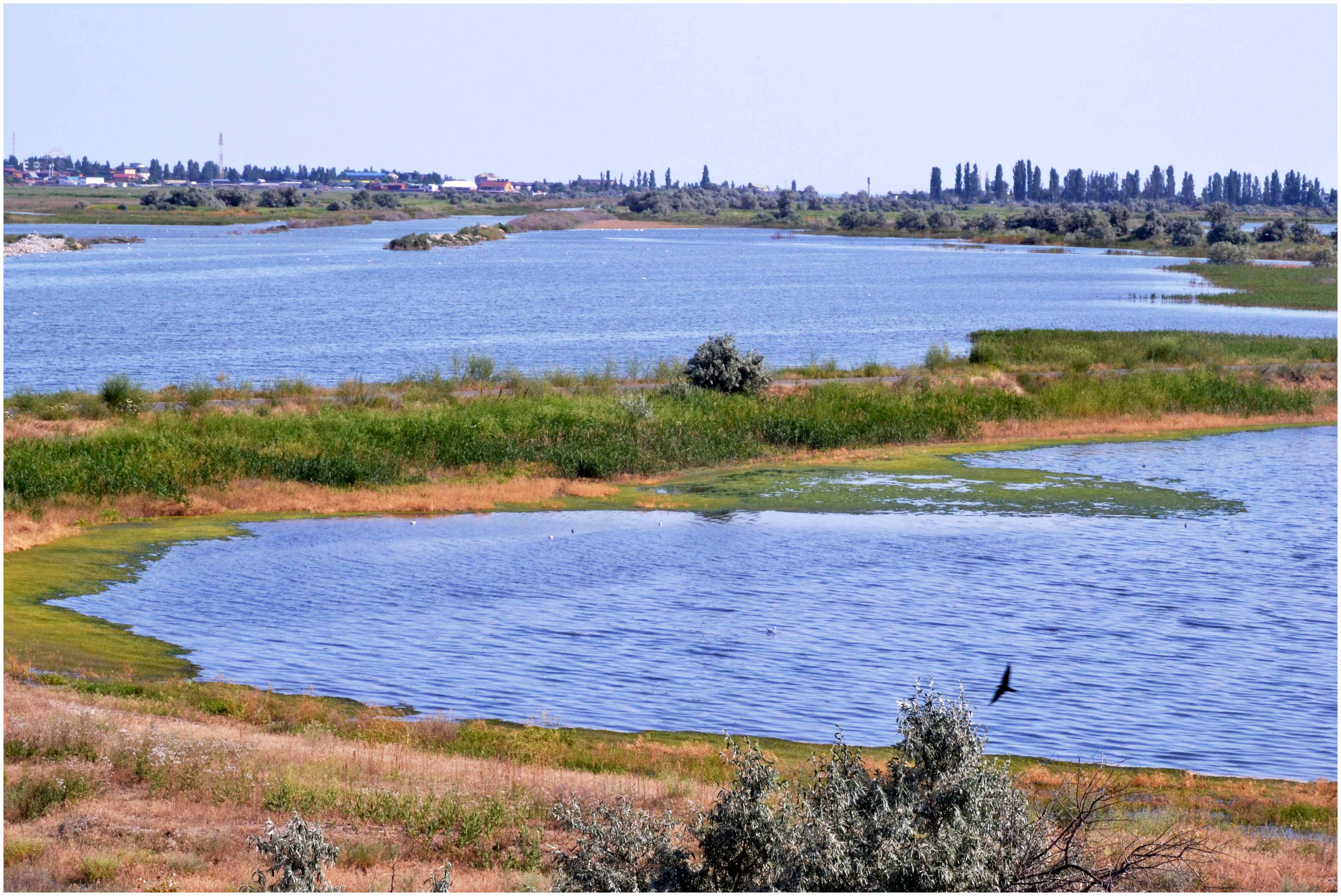
Tylihul Peresyp

The Black Sea peresyp ecosystem is unique.

Russian пересыпь is derived from the verb пересыпать, "sprinkle over".

== See also ==
- Braid bar
- Mouth bar
