= Stream power =

- Water flowing in creek
- Common symbols: Ω, ω
- SI unit: Watts
- In SI base units: kg m^{2} s^{−3}
- Derivations from other quantities: Ω=ρgQS
- Dimension: M L^{2} T^{−3}

Stream power, originally derived by R. A. Bagnold in the 1960s, is the amount of energy the water in a river or stream is exerting on the sides and bottom of the river. Stream power is the result of multiplying the density of the water, the acceleration of the water due to gravity, the volume of water flowing through the river, and the slope of that water. There are many forms of the stream power formula with varying utilities, such as comparing rivers of various widths or quantifying the energy required to move sediment of a certain size. Stream power is closely related to other criteria such as stream competency and shear stress. Stream power is a valuable measurement for hydrologists and geomorphologists tackling sediment transport issues as well as for civil engineers, who use it in the planning and construction of roads, bridges, dams, and culverts.

== History ==
Although many authors had suggested the use of power formulas in sediment transport in the decades preceding Bagnold's work, and in fact Bagnold himself suggested it a decade before putting it into practice in one of his other works, it wasn't until 1966 that R. A. Bagnold tested this theory experimentally to validate whether it would indeed work or not. This was successful and since then, many variations and applications of stream power have surfaced. The lack of fixed guidelines on how to define stream power in this early stage lead to many authors publishing work under the name "stream power" while not always measuring the entity in the same way; this led to partially failed efforts to establish naming conventions for the various forms of the formula by Rhoads two decades later in 1986. Today stream power is still used and new ways of applying it are still being discovered and researched, with a large integration into modern numerical models utilizing computer simulations.

== Derivation ==
It can be derived by the fact that if the water is not accelerating and the river cross-section stays constant (generally good assumptions for an averaged reach of a stream over a modest distance), all of the potential energy lost as the water flows downstream must be used up in friction or work against the bed: none can be added to kinetic energy. Therefore, the potential energy drop is equal to the work done to the bed and banks, which is the stream power.

We know that change in potential energy over change in time is given by the equation:

$\frac{\Delta PE}{\Delta t} = m g \frac{\Delta z}{\Delta t}$

where water mass and gravitational acceleration are constant. We can use the channel slope and the stream velocity as a stand-in for ${\Delta z}/{\Delta t}$: the water will lose elevation at a rate given by the downward component of velocity $u_z$. For a channel slope (as measured from the horizontal) of $\alpha$:

$\frac{\Delta z}{\Delta t} = u_z = u \sin(\alpha) \approx u S$

where $u$ is the downstream flow velocity. It is noted that for small angles, $\sin(\alpha) \approx \tan(\alpha) = S$. Rewriting the first equation, we now have:

$\frac{\Delta PE}{\Delta t} = m g u S$

Remembering that power is energy per time and using the equivalence between work against the bed and loss in potential energy, we can write:

$\Omega = \frac{\Delta PE}{\Delta t}$

Finally, we know that mass is equal to density times volume. From this, we can rewrite the mass on the right hand side

$m = \rho L b h$

where $L$ is the channel length, $b$ is the channel width (breadth), and $h$ is the channel depth (height). We use the definition of discharge

$Q = u b h$

where $A$ is the cross-sectional area, which can often be reasonably approximated as a rectangle with the characteristic width and depth. This absorbs velocity, width, and depth. We define stream power per unit channel length, so that term goes to 1, and the derivation is complete.

$\Omega = \rho g Q \cancelto{1}{L} S$

== Various Forms ==
=== (Total) Stream power ===
Stream power is the rate of energy dissipation against the bed and banks of a river or stream per unit downstream length. It is given by the equation:

$\Omega=\rho g Q S$

where Ω is the stream power, ρ is the density of water (1000 kg/m^{3}), g is acceleration due to gravity (9.8 m/s^{2}), Q is discharge (m^{3}/s), and S is the channel slope.

==== Total Stream Power ====
Total stream power often refers simply to stream power, but some authors use it as the rate of energy dissipation against the bed and banks of a river or stream per entire stream length. It is given by the equation:

$Total\ stream \ power = \Omega\ L$

where Ω is the stream power, per unit downstream length and L is the length of the stream.

=== Unit (or Specific) Stream power ===
Unit stream power is stream power per unit channel width, and is given by the equation:

$\omega=\frac{\rho g Q S}{b}$

where ω is the unit stream power, and b is the width of the channel. Normalizing the stream power by the width of the river allows for a better comparison between rivers of various widths. This also provides a better estimation of the sediment carrying capacity of the river as wide rivers with high stream power are exerting less force per surface area than a narrow river with the same stream power, as they are losing the same amount of energy but in the narrow river it is concentrated into a smaller area.

=== Critical Unit Stream Power ===
Critical unit stream power is the amount of stream power needed to displace a grain of a specific size, it is given by the equation:

$\omega_0= \tau_0\nu_0$

where τ_{0} is the critical shear stress of the grain size that will be moved which can be found in the literature or experimentally determined while v_{0} is the critical mobilization speed.

== Relationships to other variables ==
=== Size of displaced sediment ===
Critical stream power can be used to determine the stream competency of a river, which is a measure to determine the largest grain size that will be moved by a river. In rivers with large sediment sizes the relationship between critical unit stream power and sediment diameter displaced can be reduced to:

$\omega_0=0.030D_i^{1.69}$

While in intermediate-sized rivers the relationship was found to follow:

$\omega_0=0.130D_i^{1.438}$

=== Shear stress ===
Shear stress is another variable used in erosion and sediment transport models representing the force applied on a surface by a perpendicular force, and can be calculated using the following formula

$\tau=hS \rho g$

Where τ is the shear stress, S is the slope of the water, ρ is the density of water (1000 kg/m^{3}), g is acceleration due to gravity (9.8 m/s^{2}). Shear stress can be used to compute the unit stream power using the formula

$\omega = \tau \ V$

Where V is the velocity of the water in the stream.

== Applications ==
=== Landscape evolution ===
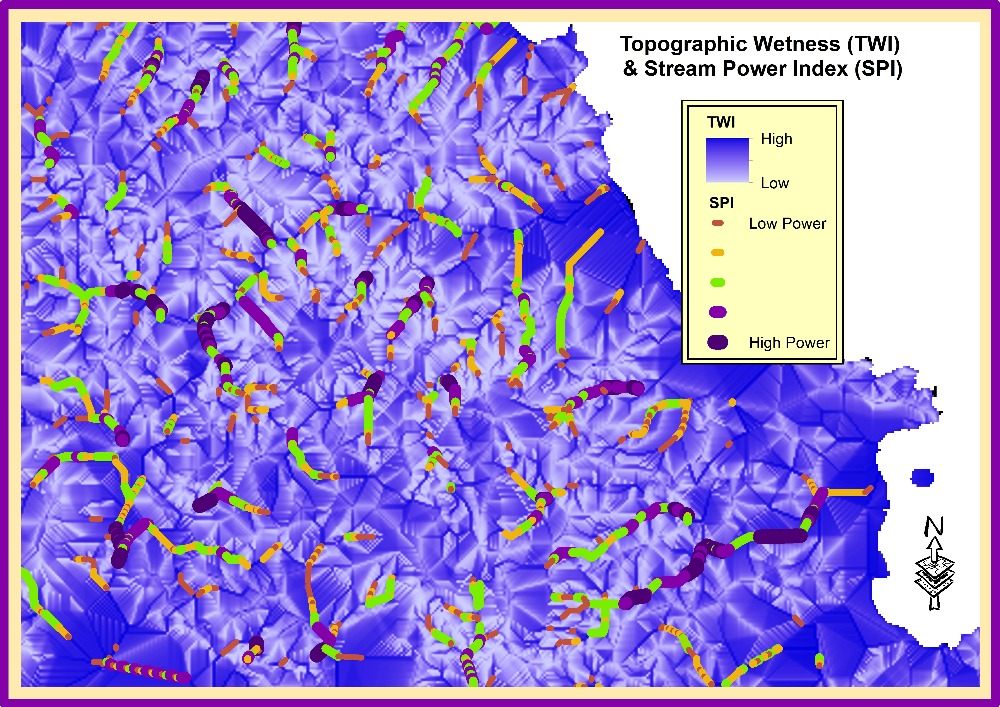
An example of a map displaying a stream power index (SPI) alongside an index displaying how wet the ground is (TWI)

Stream power is used extensively in models of landscape evolution and river incision. Unit stream power is often used for this, because simple models use and evolve a 1-dimensional downstream profile of the river channel. It is also used with relation to river channel migration, and in some cases is applied to sediment transport.

==== Predicting flood plain formation ====
By plotting stream power along the length of a river course as a second-order exponential curve, you are able to identify areas where flood plains may form and why they will form there.

==== Sensitivity to erosion ====
Stream power has also been used as a criterion to determine whether a river is in a state of reshaping itself or whether it is stable. A value of unit stream power between 30 and 35 W m^{−2} in which this transition occurs has been found by multiple studies. Another technique gaining popularity is using a gradient of stream power by comparing the unit stream power upstream to the local unit stream power ($\Delta\omega=\omega_{local}-\omega_{upstream}$) to identify patterns such as sudden jumps or drops in stream power, these features can help identify locations where the local terrain controls the flow or widens out as well as areas prone to erosion.

=== Bridge and culvert design ===
Stream power can be used as an indicator of potential damages to bridges as a result of large rain events and how strong bridges should be designed in order to avoid damage during these events. Stream power can also be used to guide culvert and bridge design in order to maintain healthy stream morphology in which fish are able to continuing traversing the water course and no erosion processes are initiated.

== See also ==
- Hydrology
- Geomorphology
- Erosion
- Sediment transport
- Shear stress
- Hydrogeomorphology
- Deposition (geology)
- Water slope
