= Braid bar =

Depositional landform in a river which splits a channel

Braid bars, or mid-channel bars, are river bars typically present in braided river channels. These formations have many names, including medial, longitudinal, crescentic, and transverse bars, as well as the more colloquial sandflat. Braid bars are distinguished from point bars due to their presence in the middle of a flow channel, rather than along a bank of the river channel.

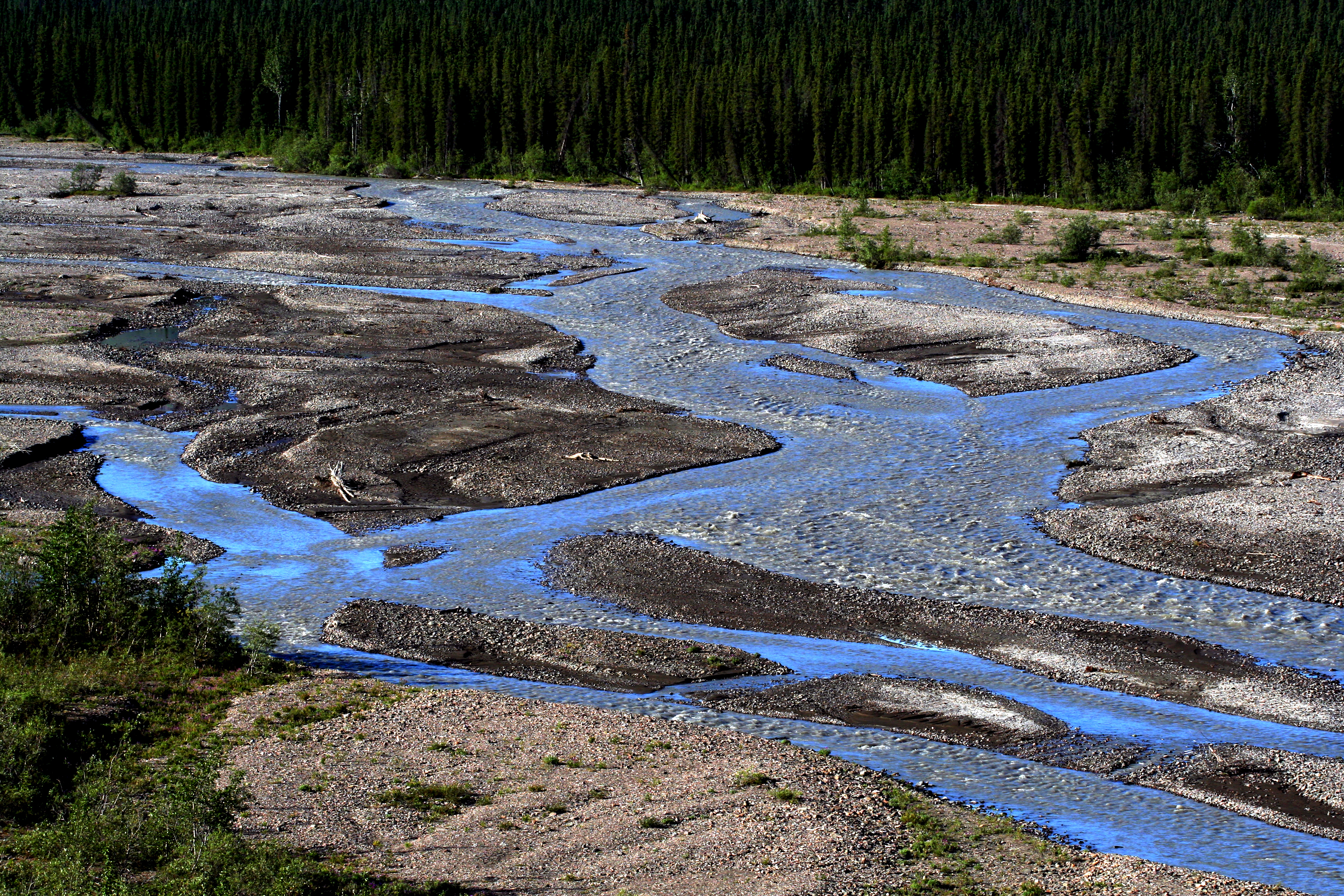
A braided river in Denali National Park, AK, showing a number of braid bars.

== Formation ==
Braid bars often originate from remnants of point bars or the growth of mid-channel unit bars in braided rivers. These features typically form in rivers with a high sediment load, within channels characterized by a large bed load and easily-eroded bank material. There are several mechanisms of formation. One explanation is that flow in the river may be redirected over a point bar, wherein the bar may be separated from the bank and thus become isolated within the channel. This forms a small ‘island’ of sediment, which can evolve into a braid bar. Alternatively, an obstacle such as a wedged log can result in the formation of a mid-channel bar if sediment is deposited along the feature.

As sediment is transported downriver, material can alternatively accrete onto the existing bar or erode away. Therefore, such features tend to be ephemeral and fluid, and can change shape quite frequently. Braided rivers can have variable, erratic flows, which can lead to successive periods of greater deposition or erosion. Entire bars can be created, destroyed, or migrate across a channel over the span of several years.

These formations are often composed of poorly-sorted sand and/or gravel. The generally coarse material is the result of the processes common to braid bar formation, and more broadly, braided rivers. Braided rivers are defined by relatively high flow power, as well as significant rates of erosion. These high rates of flow will transport fine-grained materials further downstream, while coarser material remains near the eroded bank and is eventually deposited onto mid-channel bars.

== Growth and Evolution ==
There are 6 stages for braid bar growth and morphological evolution.

1. Flow Convergence: Ideally the braid bar will form downstream of a major instance of flow convergence, at least two river channels converging. Due to the flow convergence, there will be an increase in discharge, as well as sediment supply downstream. There will be an increase in deposition downstream, leading to the formation of the braid bar.
2. Bar Initiation: The braid bar will form following a series of dune amalgamations. As sediments are deposited to form the braid bar, flow in the channel begins to diverge, with the braid bar acting as a wedge. This stage is associated with high flow in the braided river.
3. Bar Growth: Dune amalgamation continues as an accretionary dune front is developed. The accretionary dune front migrates downstream, causing deposition on top of the braid bar. The dune migration is also causing lateral accretion, further increasing the size of the braid bar. This stage is associated with low flow in the braided river. The braid bar continues to grow following at least one of the following depositional processes:
  - Lateral accretion onto existing bars.
  - Mid-channel deposition downstream of significant bank erosion.
  - Rapid deposition downstream of a major flow convergence.
4. Anabranch Dominance: As the braid bar grows, there is a change in the upstream morphology: either bar growth or bank erosion. This change in morphology will redirect channel flow to one anabranch. Due to the increase in flow in the anabranch, there will in turn be an increase in erosion of it.
5. Bar-tail Elongation: The erosion of the anabranch is deposited at the bar-tail, causing the braid bar to elongate. The elongation of the braid bar causes further flow changes across the channel. The change in flow causes more scour of the riverbed and bank erosion downstream and the opposite bank from the braid bar.
6. New Braid Bars: Deposition occurs downstream from the main braid bar, but still attached to the bar-tail. With further deposition, it will become a full braid bar. Braid bars can also continue to grow from the amalgamation of an existing braid bar and point bars present in the same channel.

== Classification ==
There is some fluidity in the distinction between braid bar and island. Compared to a braid bar, an island is regarded as having a more permanent and potentially larger structure that can influence, to some degree, the path of the river. Vegetation can be present on a braid bar, but is suggested that, on islands, vegetation has a significant stabilizing impact. This is in part due to the nature of many braided rivers, where variable flow discharge can create a hostile environment for any significant vegetation. In addition, the elevation of the island in regard to bankfull discharge should also be considered; an island will likely not be entirely submerged when bankfull discharge occurs, whereas a braid bar may be.

== Examples ==
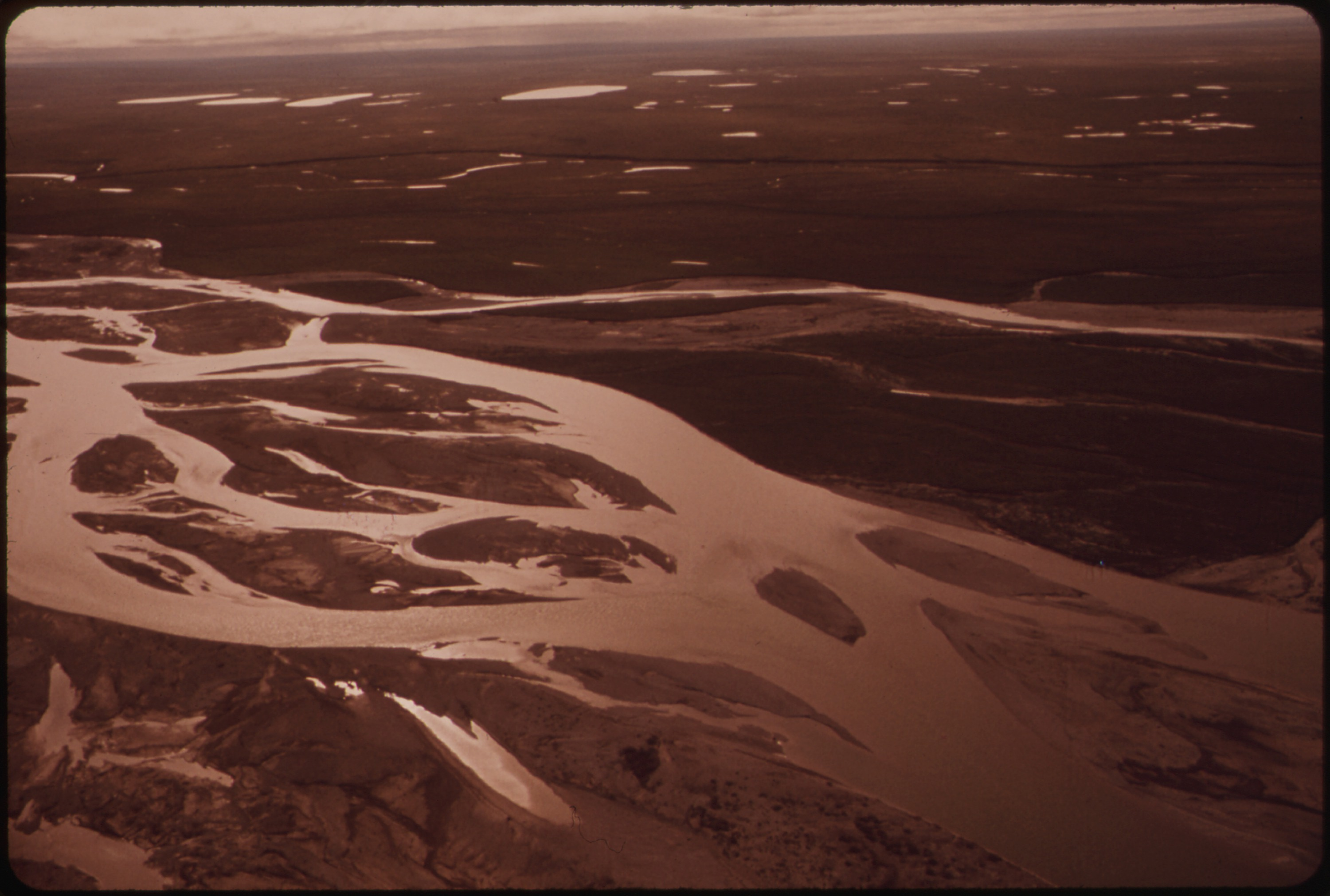
Braided channels of the Sagavanirktok River, AK, showing a number of braid bars.

- Sagavanirktok River, Alaska
- Río Paraná, Argentina
- Jumana River, Bangladesh
- South Saskatchewan River, Canada

== See also ==
- Ait – Small river islands (British English)
- Bar – Elevated region of sediment in a river that has been deposited by the flow
- Point bar – Landform related to streams and rivers
- Mouth bar – River bar in middle of river mouth
- Peresyp – Russian name for the sandbar which forms an estuary lagoon
- River island – Exposed landmass within a river
