= Stream competency =

Concept in hydrology

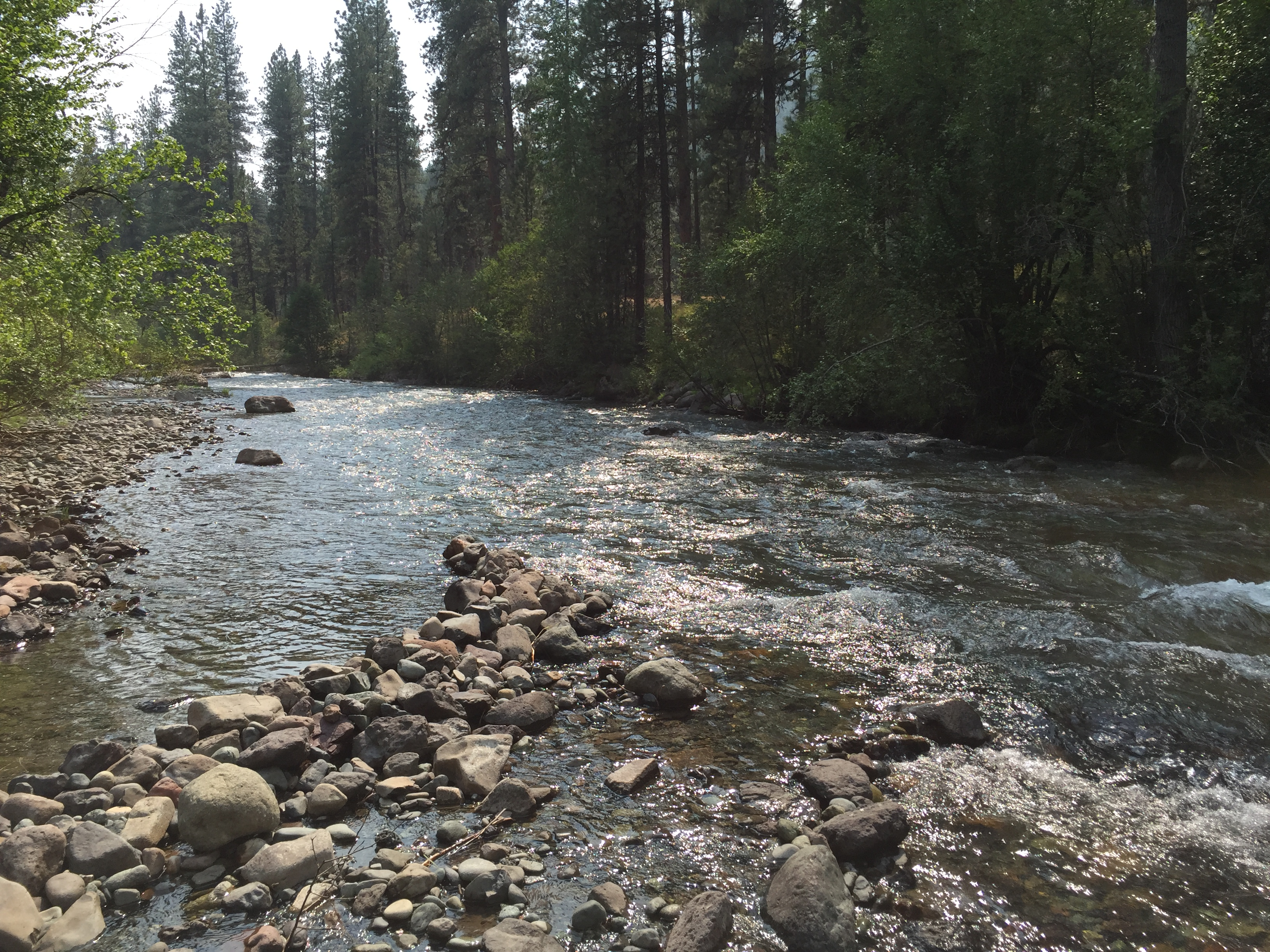
Imnaha River, Hells Canyon National Recreation Area, Oregon, example of stream competency.

In hydrology stream competency, also known as stream competence, is a measure of the maximum size of particles a stream can transport. The particles are made up of grain sizes ranging from large to small and include boulders, rocks, pebbles, sand, silt, and clay. These particles make up the bed load of the stream. Stream competence was originally simplified by the “sixth-power-law,” which states the mass of a particle that can be moved is proportional to the velocity of the river raised to the sixth power. This refers to the stream bed velocity which is difficult to measure or estimate due to the many factors that cause slight variances in stream velocities.

Stream capacity, while linked to stream competency through velocity, is the total quantity of sediment a stream can carry. Total quantity includes dissolved, suspended, saltation and bed loads.

The movement of sediment is called sediment transport. Initiation of motion involves mass, force, friction and stress. Gravity and friction are the two primary forces in play as water flows through a channel. Gravity acts upon water to move it down slope. Friction exerted on the water by the bed and banks of the channel works to slow the movement of the water. When the force of gravity is equal and opposite to the force of friction the water flows through the channel at a constant velocity. When the force of gravity is greater than the force of friction the water accelerates.

This sediment transport sorts grain sizes based on the velocity. As stream competence increases, the D_{50} (median grain size) of the stream also increases and can be used to estimate the magnitude of flow which would begin particle transport. Stream competence tends to decrease in the downstream direction, meaning the D_{50} will increase from mouth to head of the stream.

== Importance of Velocity ==
=== Stream Power ===
Stream power is the rate of potential energy loss per unit of channel length. This potential energy is lost moving particles along the stream bed.

$$\Omega = \rho_{w}gQS$$

where $\Omega$ is the stream power, $\rho_{w}$ is the density of water, $g$ is the gravitational acceleration, $S$ is the channel slope, and $Q$ is the discharge of the stream.

The discharge of a stream, $Q$, is the velocity of the stream, $U$, multiplied by the cross-sectional area, $A_{\mathrm{CS}}$, of the stream channel at that point:

$$Q = UA_{\mathrm{CS}}$$

in which $Q$ is the discharge of the stream, $U$ is the average stream velocity, and $A_{\mathrm{CS}}$ is the cross-sectional area of the stream.

As velocity increases, so does stream power, and a larger stream power corresponds to an increased ability to move bed load particles.

=== Shear Stress and Critical Shear Stress ===
In order for sediment transport to occur in gravel bed channels, flow strength must exceed a critical threshold, called the critical threshold of entrainment, or threshold of mobility. Flow over the surface of a channel and floodplain creates a boundary shear stress field. As discharge increases, shear stress increases above a threshold and starts the process of sediment transport. A comparison of the flow strength available during a given discharge to the critical shear strength needed to mobilize the sediment on the bed of the channel helps us predict whether or not sediment transport is likely to occur, and to some degree, the sediment size likely to move. Although sediment transport in natural rivers varies wildly, relatively simple approximations based on simple flume experiments are commonly used to predict transport. Another way to estimate stream competency is to use the following equation for critical shear stress, $\tau_{c}$ which is the amount of shear stress required to move a particle of a certain diameter.

$$\tau_{c} = \tau_{c}^{\ast}(\rho_{s}-\rho_{w})gd_{50}$$

where:

$\tau_{c}^{\ast} =$ Shields parameter, a dimensionless value which describes the resistance of the stream bed to gravitational acceleration, also described as roughness or friction,
$\rho_{s} =$ Particle density, and $\rho_{s}-\rho_{w}$ is the effective density of the particle when submerged in water (Archimedes principle).
$g =$ Gravitational acceleration.
$d_{50} =$ grain diameter, usually measured as d50 which is the median particle diameter when sampling particle diameters in a stream transect.

The shear stress of a stream is represented by the following equation:

$$\tau = \rho_{w}gDS$$

where:

$D =$ average depth
$S =$ stream slope.

If we combine the two equations we get:

$$\rho_{w}gDS = \tau_{c}^{\ast}(\rho_{s}-\rho_{w})gd_{50}$$

Solving for particle diameter d we get

$$d_{50} = \frac{\rho_{w}DS}{\tau_{c}^{\ast}(\rho_{s}-\rho_{w})}$$

The equation shows particle diameter, $d_{50}$, is directly proportional to both the depth of water and slope of stream bed (flow and velocity), and inversely proportional to Shield's parameter and the effective density of the particle.

=== Lift ===
Velocity differences between the bottom and tops of particles can lead to lift. Water is allowed to flow above the particle but not below resulting in a zero and non-zero velocity at the bottom and top of the particle respectively. The difference in velocities results in a pressure gradient that imparts a lifting force on the particle. If this force is greater than the particle's weight, it will begin transport.

=== Turbulence ===
Flows are characterized as either laminar or turbulent. Low-velocity and high-viscosity fluids are associated with laminar flow, while high-velocity and low-viscosity are associated with turbulent flows. Turbulent flows result velocities that vary in both magnitude and direction. These erratic flows help keep particles suspended for longer periods of time. Most natural channels are considered to have turbulent flow.

== Other influencing factors ==
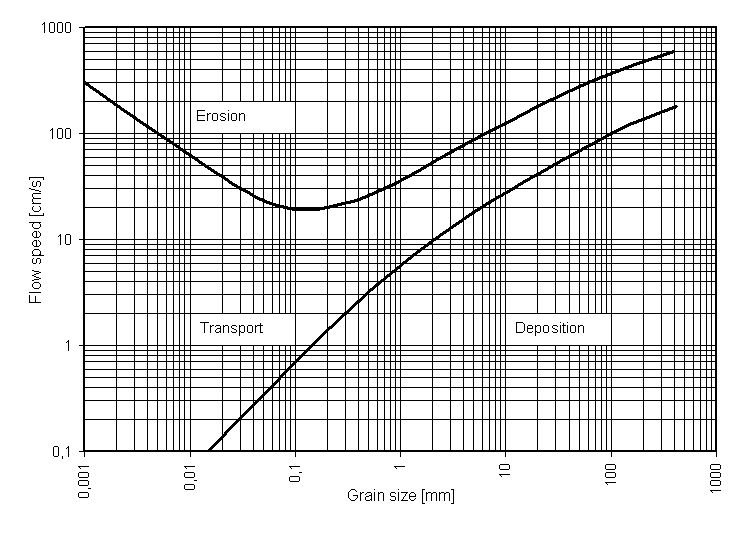
Hjulström curve

=== Cohesion ===
Another important property comes into play when discussing stream competency, and that is the intrinsic quality of the material. In 1935 Filip Hjulström published his curve, which takes into account the cohesiveness of clay and some silt. This diagram illustrates stream competency as a function of velocity.

By observing the size of boulders, rocks, pebbles, sand, silt, and clay in and around streams, one can understand the forces at work shaping the landscape. Ultimately these forces are determined by the amount of precipitation, the drainage density, relief ratio and sediment parent material. They shape depth and slope of the stream, velocity and discharge, channel and floodplain, and determine the amount and kind of sediment observed. This is how the power of water moves and shapes the landscape through erosion, transport, and deposition, and it can be understood by observing stream competency.

=== Bedrock ===
Stream competence does not rely solely on velocity. The bedrock of the stream influences the stream competence. Differences in bedrock will affect the general slope and particle sizes in the channel. Stream beds that have sandstone bedrock tend to have steeper slopes and larger bed material, while shale and limestone stream beds tend to be shallower with smaller grain size. Slight variations in underlying material will affect erosion rates, cohesion, and soil composition.

=== Vegetation ===
Vegetation has a known impact on a stream's flow, but its influence is hard to isolate. A disruption in flow will result in lower velocities, leading to a lower stream competence. Vegetation has a 4-fold effect on stream flow: resistance to flow, bank strength, nucleus for bar sedimentation, and construction and breaching of log-jams.

==== Resistance to flow ====
Cowan method for estimating Manning's n.

$$n = (n_{0}+n_{1}+n_{2}+n_{3}+n_{4})m_{5}$$

Manning's n considers a vegetation correction factor. Even stream beds with minimal vegetation will have flow resistance.

==== Bank strength ====
Vegetation growing in the stream bed and channel helps bind sediment and reduce erosion in a stream bed. A high root density will result in a reinforced stream channel.

==== Nucleus for Bar Sedimentation ====
Vegetation-sediment interaction. Vegetation that gets caught in the middle of a stream will disrupt flow and lead to sedimentation in the resulting low velocity eddies. As the sedimentation continues, the island grows, and flow is further impacted.

==== Construction and Breaching of Log-jams ====
Vegetation-vegetation interaction. Build-up of vegetation carried by streams eventually cuts off-flow completely to side or main channels of a stream. When these channels are closed, or opened in the case of a breach, the flow characteristics of the stream are disrupted.
