= Pendant bar =

Streamlined gravel bar below an obstruction

A pendant bar is a large, streamlined, fluvial bar that is typically composed of gravel which occurs just downstream of a bedrock obstruction within a river channel or floodway that has been scoured by either an outburst flood, megaflood, or jökulhlaup. They are often associated with giant current ripples. Malde introduced this to refer to streamlined mounds of gravel deposited by the Bonneville Flood that lie downstream of bedrock projections on the scoured valley floor of the Snake River. They are most common type of bar found within the Channeled Scablands created by the Missoula floods. The obstruction for the initiation of pendant bars in the Channeled Scablands is typically either a knob of basalt or the relict bend of a pre-flood meandering valley.

In the Channeled Scablands the larger pendant bars in are up to 2 kilometers (1.2 mi) long and rise 30 m (98 ft) above the floors of the preflood valleys. The bar surfaces lie 30–60 m (98–197 ft) below the high-water surface at the time of their formation. During regular annual floods in Central Texas and elsewhere, much smaller, analogous, mid-channel bars form downstream from river channel obstructions, e.g. large boulders of rockfall, or in the lee of barriers of stable trees and logjams.

== Occurrence ==
Pendant bars are associated with the deposits and landforms formed by outburst floods and megafloods on both Earth and Mars. In addition to the Channeled Scablands and the valley of the Snake River, pendant bars have been reported from deposits of the formed by the Maumee Torrent in the Maumee River valley of Indiana; the southern spillway of glacial Lake Agassiz; the Souris spillway near Elcott, Saskatchewan; and Ares Vallis, one of the largest cataclysmic flood channels on Mars.

== Internal structure ==
The pendant bars studied within the Channeled Scablands are composed of well-developed foreset beds. These foreset beds always dips downstream. They consist either of well-sorted subrounded boulders and cobbles or granules and pebbles with an openwork structure. The boulders and cobbles typically exhibit numerous percussion flake scars. Also, many of the rounded boulders and cobbles are broken into fragments that Bretz called broken rounds.

== Origin ==
Pendant bars form as high-velocity floodwater moves around an obstruction. There, pendant bars accumulate in a zone of localized flow expansion and deceleration downstream of any obstacle which lies within the main flow path. A similar process forms a sand splay, which is much like a shoal but is formed on floodplains or terraces in lower-intensity flooding episodes. Other related fluvial bars that are formed by outburst floods and jökulhlaups are longitudinal, expansion, and eddy bars.

== See also ==
- Bedform – Geological feature resulting from the movement of bed material by fluid flow
