= Hydrogeomorphology =

Hydrogeomorphology has been defined as “an interdisciplinary science that focuses on the interaction and linkage of hydrologic processes with landforms or earth materials and the interaction of geomorphic processes with surface and subsurface water in temporal and spatial dimensions.” The term 'hydro-geomorphology’ designates the study of landforms caused by the action of water. By this definition hydro-geomorphology is inseparable part of geomorphology moreover fluvial geomorphology, because water is one of the most important agents in forming and shaping of landforms. From the groundwater point of view integration of geological, structural and hydrological data with hydro-geomorphologic data is very much useful in finding out the groundwater potential zones with fruitful results. The science relating to the geographical, geological, and hydrological aspects of water bodies and to changes to these aspects in response to low variations and to natural and human caused events, such as heavy rainfall or channel straightening is the hydro-geomorphology.

Hydrogeomorphology describes and evaluates the environment, in which water circulates, thus providing the information to understand the situation and to make the proper decisions. Quantitative study of drainage basin provides the theoretical base for the hydrogeomorphic approach, suggesting that certain unvarying drainage basin characters can be correlated to the hydrologic response of a basin. The measurable description of a drainage basin can be grouped in to linear aspect of channel network, areal aspect of drainage basin, relief aspect of channel system and basin form. Hydro-geomorphology is science that deals with occurrences of water with respect to landform. Hydrogeomorphology of a drainage basin is a function of rainfall kinematics, surface topography, drainage basin morphology and runoff etc. All these aspects are regarded as the potential to describe hydrogeomorphic properties of the drainage basin. Because of non-availability of hydrological data, discharge data and sediment load data over a sufficient period of time in ungauged catchments, various investigators have used the drainage basin parameters to study the hydrogeomorphology of the drainage basin. Hydrogeomorphic studies of drainage basin often suffer a setback due to lack of long-term data. Therefore, there is need to extrapolate the results of few small subsystems to other hydrologically and geomorphologically similar basins, which mostly remain ungauged for want of enormous resource and time involved in instrumentation and monitoring them. Importance of hydrology for geomorphological purposes has been increasingly appreciated among geomorphologists in the last few decades. Earlier geomorphologists were bounded to use different unconventional approach to evaluate the characteristics of rivers and drainage basins to get proper idea of various aspects of the water crisis.

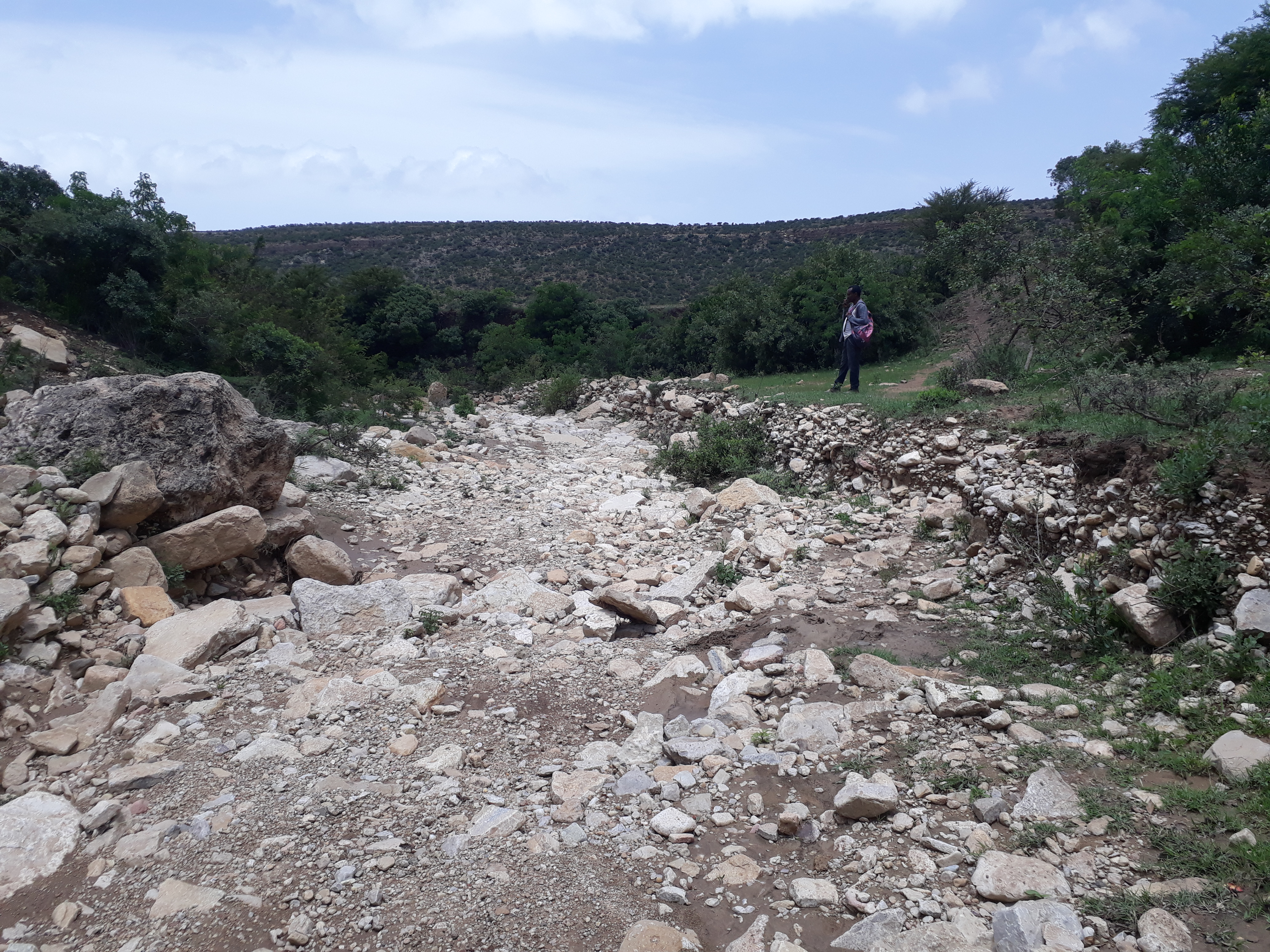
Example of a feedback effect in hydrogeomorphology: this river in Addilal (Ethiopia) is incising, due to reforestation on the upper slopes, hence much less sediment is brought in and the river erodes its own bed - this is called "clear water effect"

R. E. Horton pioneered the hydrologic and hydromorphometric analysis of basin and provided a rational and systematic base. He framed the geomorphic parameters with hydrologic parameters of the drainage system. Thus hydrological criteria not only assist the geomorphologists to evaluate the hydrogeomorphic characteristics of a drainage basin also facilitate their extrapolation in space and time. Mark M. Brinson proposed A Hydrogeomorphic Classification for Wetlands in 1993.
