= Geology of Peru =

The geology of Peru includes ancient Proterozoic rocks, Paleozoic and Mesozoic volcanic and sedimentary rocks, and numerous basins and the Andes Mountains formed in the Cenozoic.

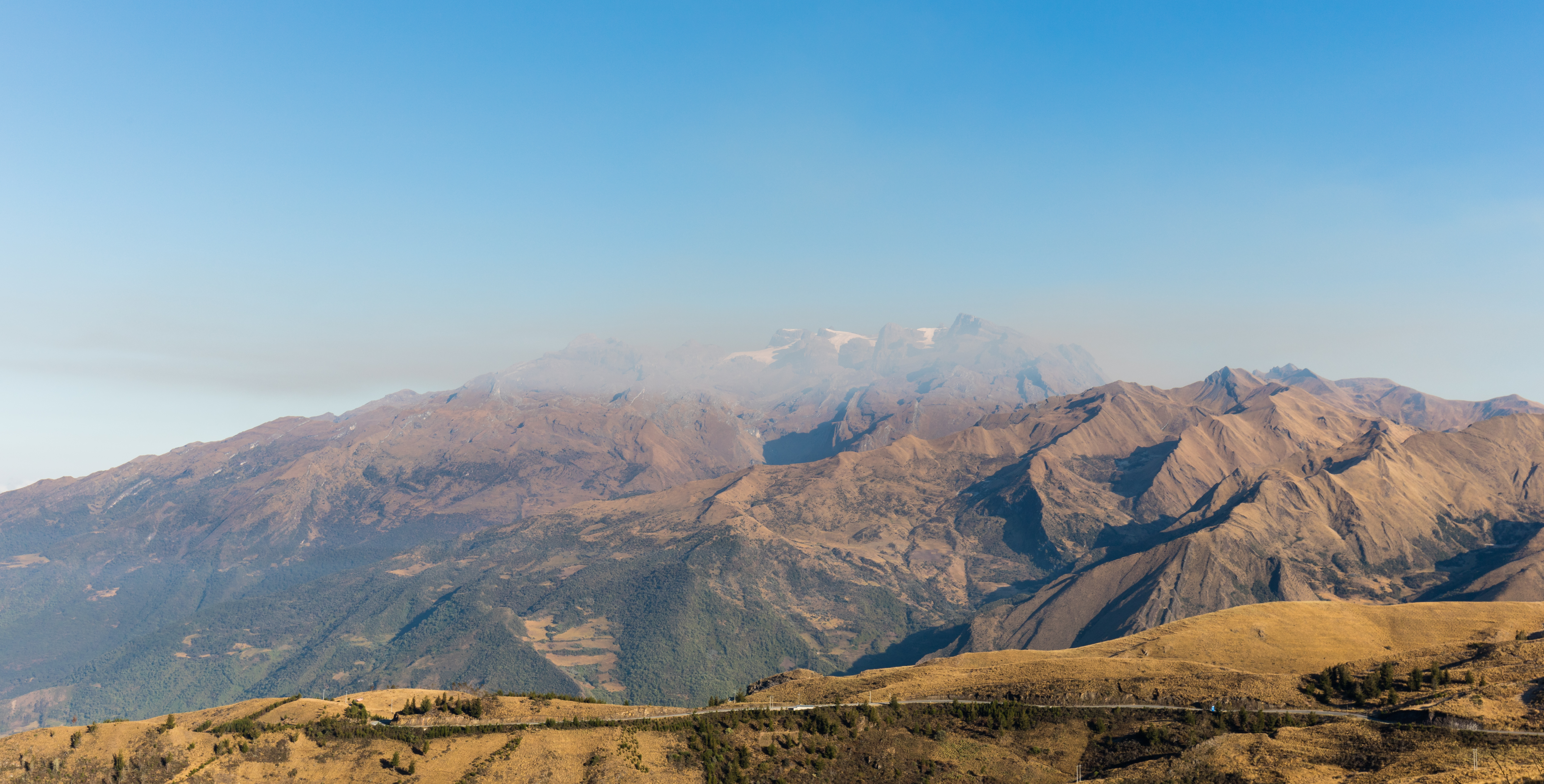
Andes Mountains in Peru

== Geological history, stratigraphy and tectonics ==
The oldest rocks in Peru date to the Precambrian and are more than two billion years old. Along the southern coast, granulite and charnockite shows reworking by an ancient orogeny mountain building event. Situated close to the Peru-Chile Trench, these rocks have anomalously high strontium isotope ratios, which suggest recent calc-alkaline volcanism.

In the Eastern Cordillera of Peru, Precambrian magmatism in the Huanuco region produced ultramafic, mafic and felsic rocks, including serpentinite, meta-diorite, meta-gabbro, meta-tonalite and diorite and granite that intruded after the first phase of orogenic tectonic activity.

The basement of the Central Andean orogeny includes the rocks of the Arequipa Massif, which reach granulite grade on the sequence of metamorphic facies and formed around 1.9 billion years ago. Zircon grains in these rocks match those in Labrador, Greenland and Scotland, indicating that much of western South America originated as a promontory of the proto-North American continent Laurentia.

=== Paleozoic (541-251 million years ago) ===
In the Paleozoic, Peru was on the western margin of the supercontinent Gondwana. Analysis of Ordovician and Devonian sandstones in the Eastern Cordillera (spanning into Bolivia) indicates eroded zircon grains formed to the east in Brazil during the Brasiliano orogeny. By contrast, Altiplano and Coastal Cordillera sandstones seem to have originated from the Arequipa Massif.

Plutonic and volcanic rocks in the Inner Arc domain (later uplifted in the Central Andean orogeny) include the high-grade, low-pressure metamorphic gabbro-granite of the San Gaban Complex and early Permian Mitu Group alkali basalts. Rocks, such as those in the Mitu Group, formed during pulses of magmatism in back-arc basins. Parts of central North America were adjacent to western South America during the late Paleozoic, helping to drive folding and metamorphism.

The region was affected by the Hercynian orogeny from 550 to 220 million years ago, leading to granitoid intrusion, nepheline syenite, syntectonic granites and calc-alkaline volcanism.

Along the coast, subduction produced basins on land and volcanic activity, that resulted in the two kilometer thick Yamayo Group and the overlying one to six kilometer volcanic and volcaniclastic Yura Group.

=== Mesozoic (251-66 million years ago) ===
The Andean orogeny began in the late Triassic. In the south, the two kilometer Chocolate Formation formed with sedimentary rocks into the late Triassic. Central Peru experienced less magmatic activity than during the Hercynian orogeny, but acid plutonic rocks emplaced in the center of the country.

The Pucara Basin subsided on the landward side of a structural high from the Triassic into the early Jurassic. The basin filled first with carbonates and then with argillite followed by shallow water carbonates. Some carbonates were later transformed to dolomite and the basin's rocks show signs of Mississippi Valley Type lead-zinc mineralization, common in basin-forming shear zones.

In the area of Puno-Santa Lucia, which was slowly being uplifted as the Andes, two kilometer Paleozoic Cabanillas Group quartzite and shale is overlain by the 1.5 kilometer Jurassic Lagunillas Group. The Huancane and Moho groups include red beds and limestone, formed in closed basin.

The 1600 kilometer Coastal Batholith of Peru formed in an ensialic marginal basin in the early Cretaceous, with the emplacement of pillow lavas, gabbro and volcaniclastic rocks. In the north, it formed as new continental crust with no older continental crust beneath it, while to the south it spans thick Precambrian rocks.

=== Cenozoic (66 million years ago-present) ===
As the Andean orogeny accelerated from the Albian, rock deformation shifted toward the Amazonian foredeep. The Marañón fold and thrust belt formed in the Eocene, bounding the Western Cordillera. Crustal shortening produced a sialic root to the Andes.

Marine transgressions swept the region starting in the Eocene, emplacing conglomerate, sandstone, siltstone, mudstone and diatomite in the Sechura Basin and Pisco Basin—a pair of forearc basins in the north.

The Miocene-aged Cordillera Blanca Batholith intrudes the Coastal Batholith over 50 kilometer thick crust, with S-type peraluminous granites produced by deformation and uplift. The majority of rocks in the batholith are high-sodium, high-silica I-type granites, with characteristics that have been interpreted as subducted oceanic crust melts. However, it does not have positioning consistent with subduction and geologists have interpreted it as underplating leading to partial melting, the formation of trondhjemitic magmas rich in clinopyroxene, garnet and amphibole. Intense volcanism, deformation and plutonism was common in the Miocene and Pliocene in central Peru.

In the last 2.5 million years of the Quaternary, andesite lavas erupted, forming the Arequipa and Barosso groups in the south, including partially melted Precambrian granulite gneiss, with a high lead concentration.
