= Earth system interactions across mountain belts =

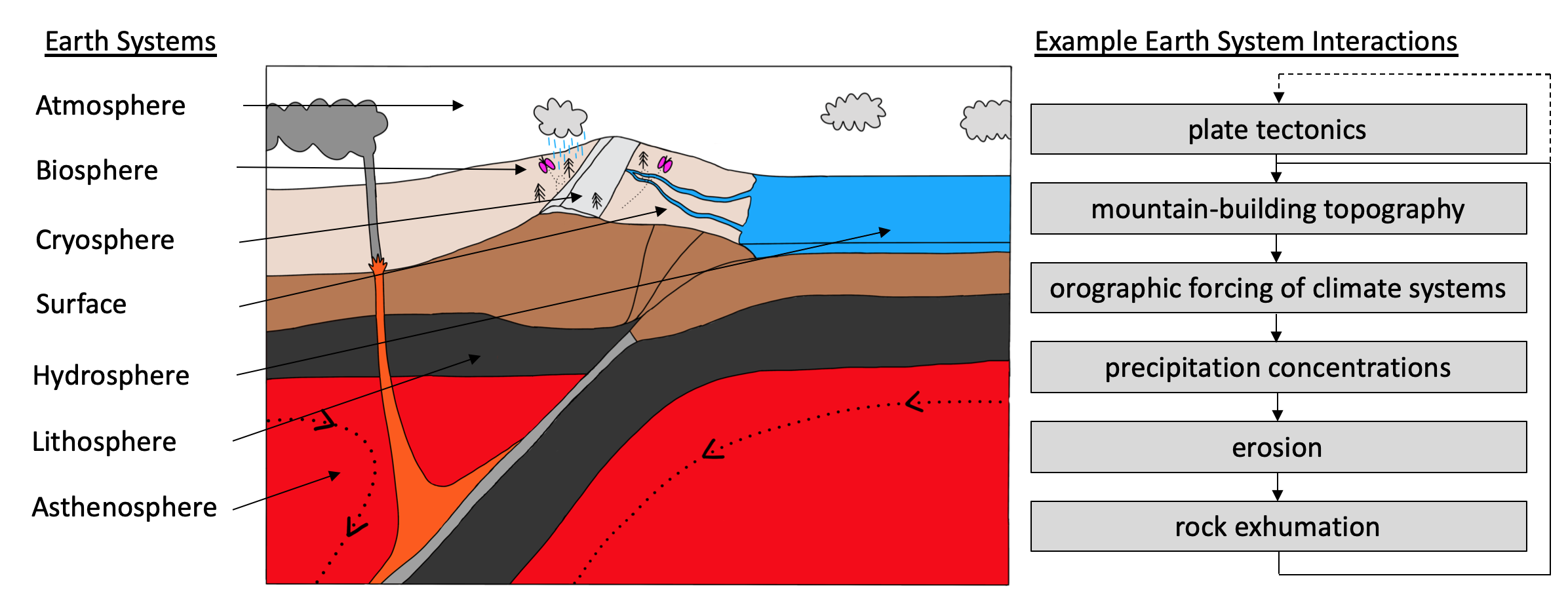
Earth systems and examples of Earth system interactions across mountain belts.

Earth system interactions across mountain belts are interactions between processes occurring in the different systems or "spheres" of the Earth, as these influence and respond to each other through time. Earth system interactions involve processes occurring at the atomic to planetary scale which create linear and non-linear feedback(s) involving multiple Earth systems. This complexity makes modelling Earth system interactions difficult because it can be unclear how processes of different scales within the Earth interact to produce larger scale processes which collectively represent the dynamics of the Earth as an intricate interactive adaptive system.

== Earth systems ==
Earth systems across mountain belts include the asthenosphere (ductile region of the upper mantle), lithosphere (crust and uppermost upper mantle), surface, atmosphere, hydrosphere, cryosphere, and biosphere. Across mountain belts these Earth systems each have their own processes which interact within the system they belong.

Interaction of the asthenosphere, lithosphere, and surface though the mantle process of subduction at an oceanic-continental plate boundary. Volcanism which originates from the mantle occurs on the surface.

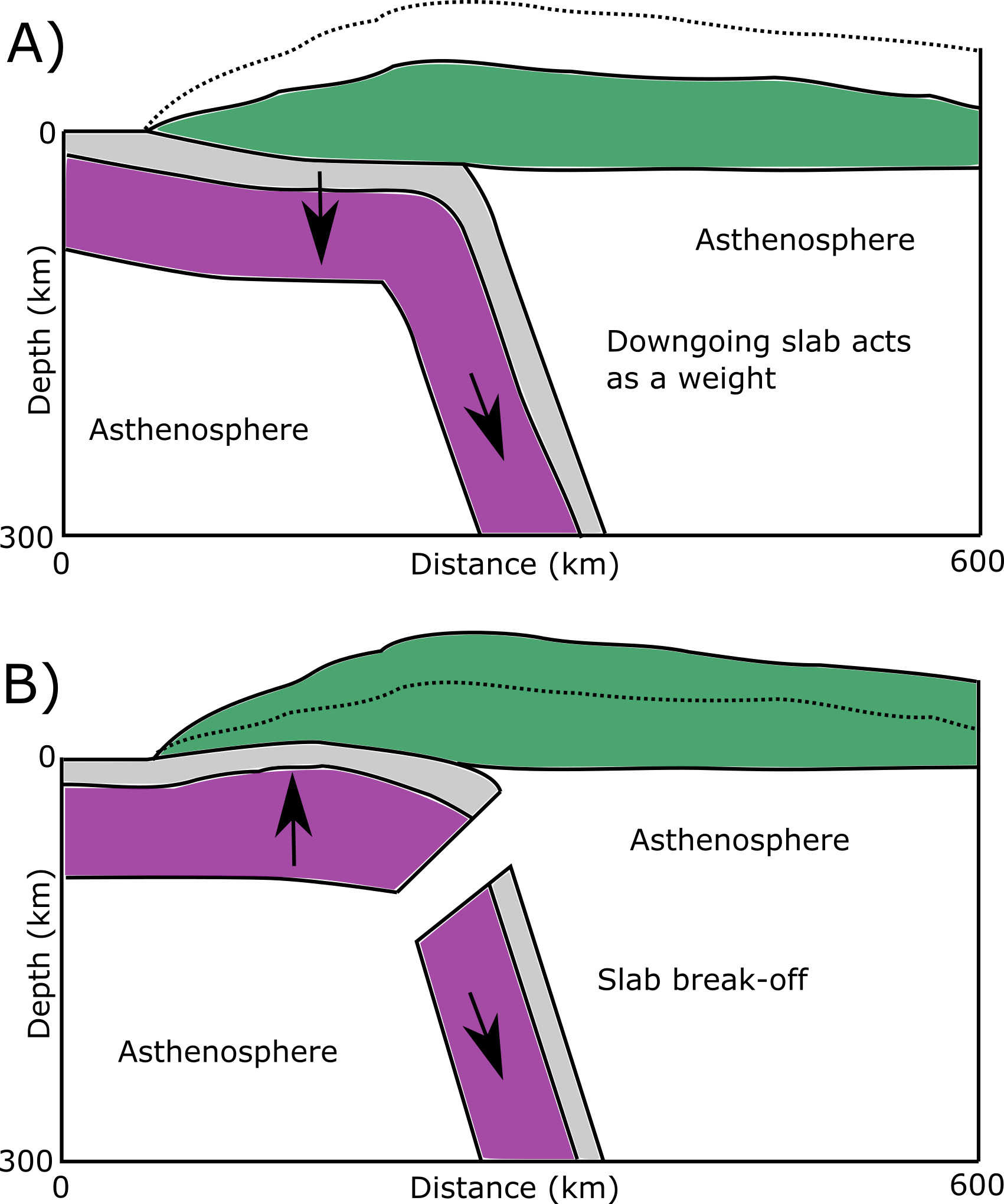
Interaction of the asthenosphere, lithosphere, and surface through the mantle process of slab break-off. Grey indicates crust, purple indicates mantle lithosphere, green indicates the overriding plate, white indicates asthenosphere. The dotted line indicates the relative difference in surface elevation before/after break-off. Downward-pointing arrows indicate topographic depression. Upward-pointing arrows indicate increases in elevation. (A) The weight of the attached subducting slab in the mantle depresses the surface topography above the slab. (B) The weight of the subducting slab is removed by slab detachment in the mantle, allowing dynamic rebound of topography above the area where the slab is broken off.

=== Mantle ===
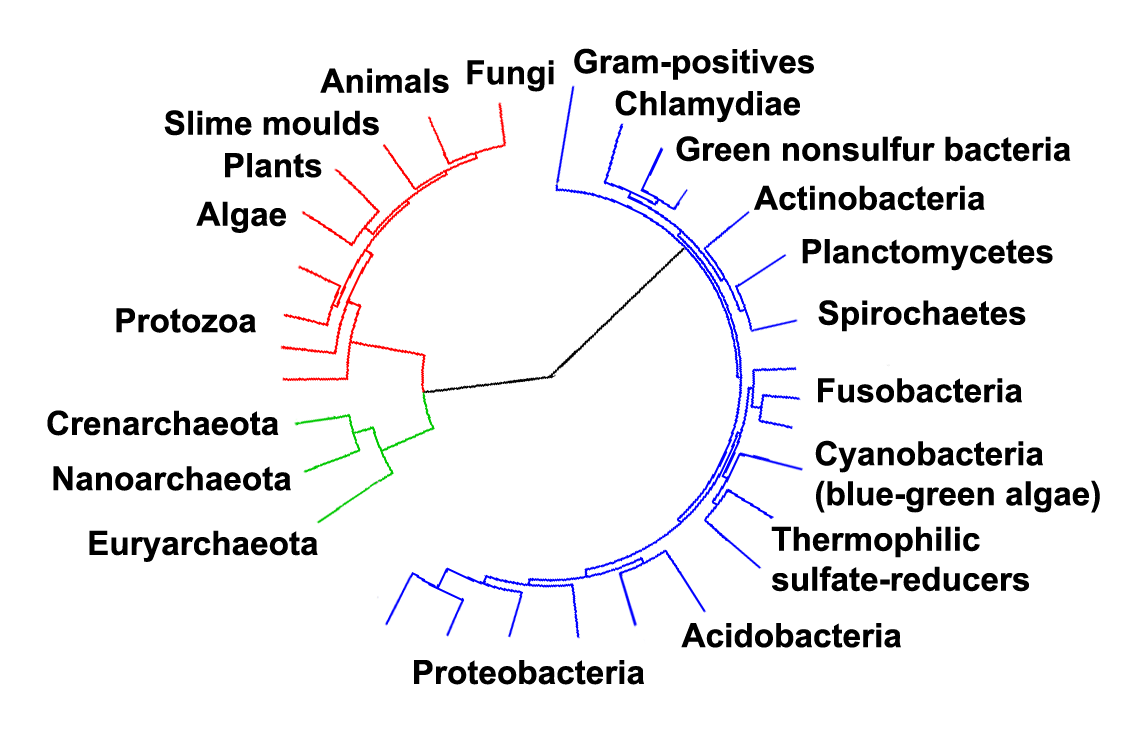
Evolutionary tree showing the divergence of modern species from their common ancestor in the centre. The three domains are coloured, with bacteria blue, archaea green and eukaryotes red. Speciation across mountain belts can be influenced by climate and plate tectonics.

Earth's mantle is the region between the core and the lithosphere. The asthenosphere is the ductile region of the upper mantle. Mantle processes which operate across mountain belts include those related to subduction (e.g., slab break-off, flat-slab subduction, subduction of a triple junction). Volcanism is driven by mantle processes such as partial melting and thermal convection currents.

=== Lithosphere ===
Earth's lithosphere is made up of the crust and elastic, uppermost part of the upper mantle. It is bounded by the surface and the lithosphere-asthenosphere boundary. Lithospheric processes accommodate mountain formation in the lithosphere. Lithospheric processes which operate across mountain belts include those related to the theory of plate tectonics (e.g. tectonic plate convergence, folding, faulting, exhumation).

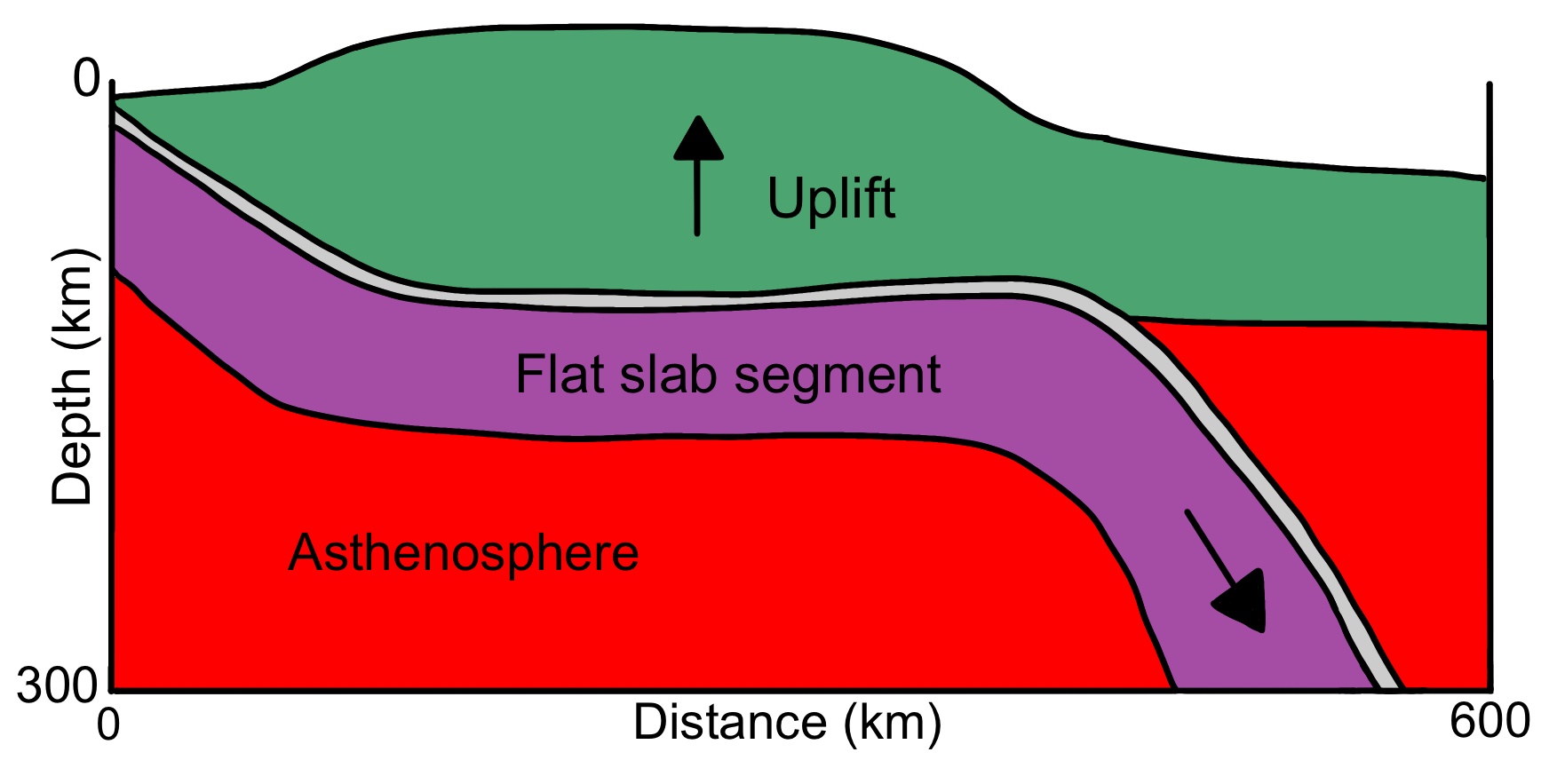
Interaction of the asthenosphere, lithosphere and surface through the mantle process of flat-slab subduction. Grey indicates crust, purple indicates mantle lithosphere, red indicates asthenosphere, green indicates the overriding plate. The area above flat slab segment has relative higher topography.

=== Surface ===
Surface processes which operate across mountain belts include denudation, weathering and erosion which lead to changes in topography. Uplifted regions become sediment source areas from which rock is eroded and transported down-slope. Volcanism occurs at the surface.

=== Atmosphere ===
The Atmosphere is a layer of gas, which traps heat. This prevents heat escaping back into space

=== Hydrosphere ===
The hydrosphere refers to all water on, under, and above the surface of the Earth. It includes the gaseous, liquid, and solid forms of water. Hydrospheric processes which operate across mountain belts include ocean circulation, groundwater flow, evaporation, and condensation.

=== Cryosphere ===
The Cryosphere refers to all solid water (ice) on, under, and above the surface of the Earth. Cryospheric processes which operate across mountain belts include freezing, melting, and glacial motion.

=== Biosphere ===
The biosphere includes all of Earth's ecosystems. Biospheric processes which operate across mountain belts include evolution, extinction, respiration, and photosynthesis.

== Interactions ==
The carbonate silicate cycle, within the long-term carbon cycle showing interactions between different Earth systems.

Interactions between Earth systems across mountain belts include mantle processes related to subduction causing changes in topography (dynamic topography) by surface processes which influence biospheric processes and climatic processes. In addition, changes in climate may influence tectonic processes via changes in surface processes.

Some system interactions during orogenesis (i.e., mountain formation) are poorly understood (e.g., between biotic evolution and orogenesis).

The rates of processes, and therefore the interactions of the systems containing distinct processes, change through time. Therefore, understanding how these systems influence each other through time is important for Earth system science.

The processes in any one Earth system may occur diachronously (at different times in different locations) along the length of mountain belt. Therefore, the influence of these processes on other Earth systems along mountain belts will also vary along the length of the mountain belt. Evidence of some of these changes can be observed and measured because they are recorded through time in the geological record.

=== Lithosphere and surface processes ===
Uplift can cause changes in sediment source because uplift causes increased erosion of sediment at the source and subsequent deposition after transportation. The rate of uplift determines the rate of erosion and therefore the sediment supply rate.

=== Mantle and topography ===
Paleotopography of mountain belts can help us understand interior Earth system geodynamics.

The dense and relatively cold subducting slab at mountain belts formed along convergent oceanic-continental plate boundaries can act as a weight which pulls down the surface elevation above the subducting slab. If this weight is removed by slab break-off then dynamic rebound will occur, expressed as an increase in surface elevation above the area where the slab broke off.

Reconstructions of present-day topography without the influence of mantle flow produce differences in elevation including an approximately 800 m increase in the Himalaya and Andes, and a shift in coastlines surrounding low-lying continental platforms. This shows that mantle processes must have an influence on topography.

=== Influence on biodiversity ===
Species richness correlates with erosion rate which is controlled by tectonic processes. This emphasises the influence that tectonic processes can have on the surface and in turn biospheric processes.

Mountain building generates species diversity. This is because orogenesis creates novel habitats where speciation occurs and immigration of species can occur.

Mountain building can also isolate groups of individuals from the same species by creating a geographic barrier, causing them to evolve as two very different species.

=== Influence on climate ===
Tectonic uplift can cause changes in subsidence, chemical weathering rates, and organic carbon burial, which in turn may cause drawdown of atmospheric carbon dioxide causing a global cooling effect.

==== Tectonic-climatic interactions ====
There is a correlation between tectonic uplift and changes in climate but the direction of causality remains unclear. It is possible that both the tectonic and climatic systems have driven each other at different points in time and that processes in these Earth systems mutually influence each other during orogenic evolution.

== Mountain belts ==
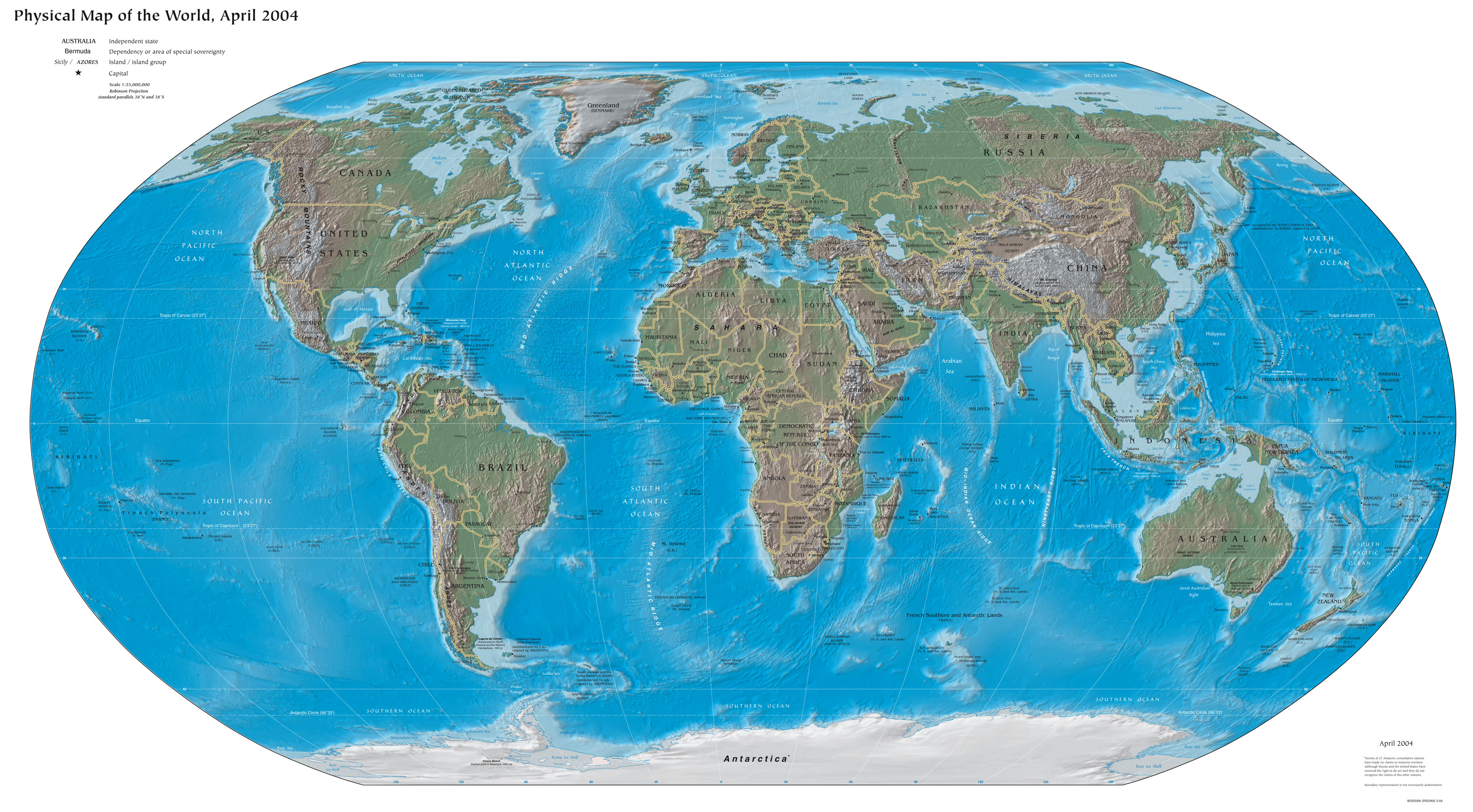
Map showing mountain belts globally.

Mountain belts are groups of mountain ranges which have arisen from the same cause which is usually an orogeny as a result of plate tectonics.

Different mountain belts experience different geological, geographical, and climatic conditions which change through time. This means that different mountain belts experience different Earth system interactions through time. Therefore, Earth system interactions should be considered within the spatial and temporal context of the mountain belt they belong. Here, examples of two mountain belts are provided - the Andes and the Himalaya.

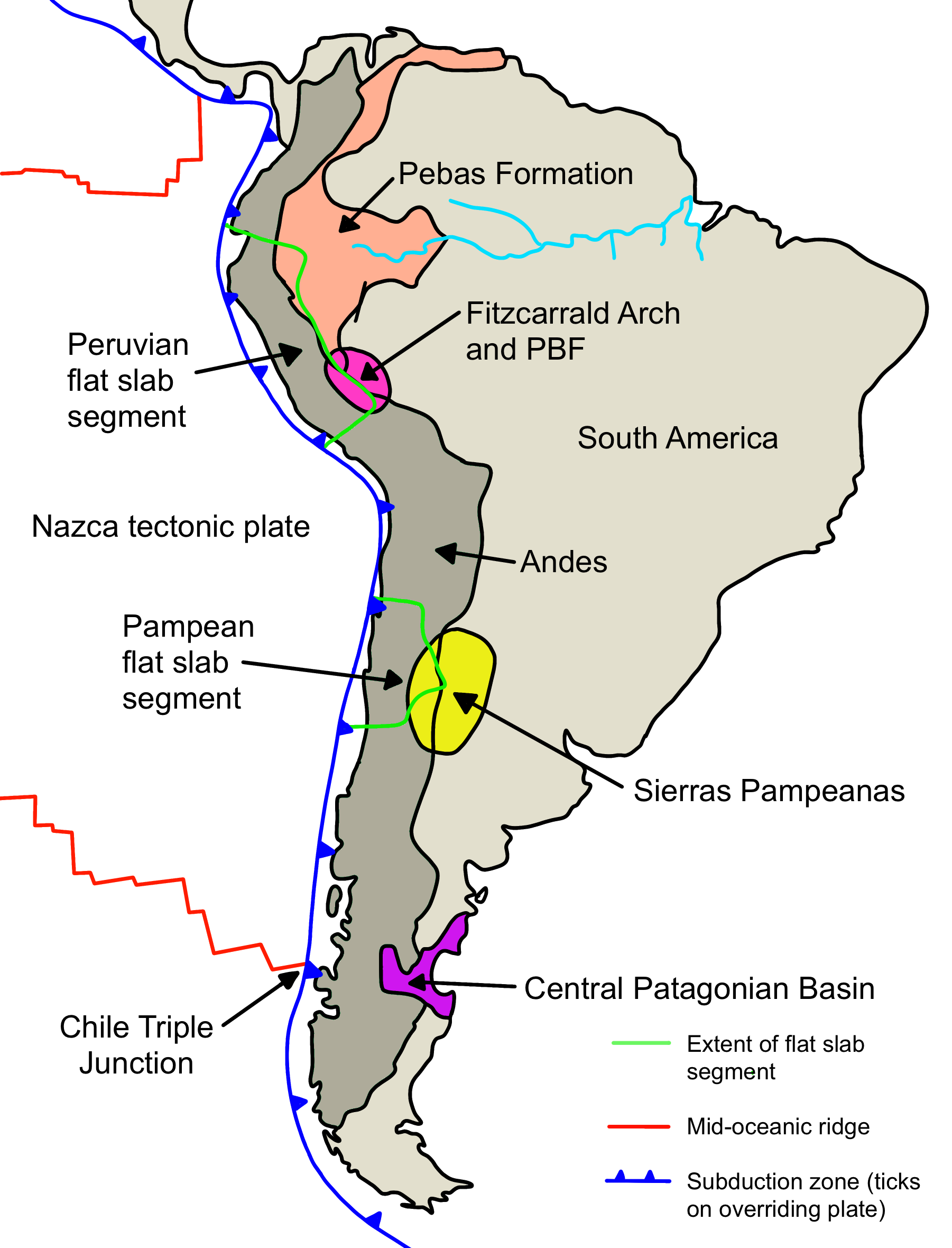
Structural geology map of South America showing topographic features formed in by subduction processes. Modified from Flament et al. (2015).

=== The Andes ===
There are multiple topographic features within South America which formed due to subduction processes.

There are two areas of flat slab subduction of the Nazca Plate in Chile and Peru along the Peruvian subduction system - the Peruvian flat slab segment and Pampean flat slab segment. The length of the subduction zone is represented by the Peru–Chile Trench. These regions of flat slab subduction have been modelled to result in dynamic uplift of northwestern South America. This uplift accounts for the cessation of shallow-water sedimentation of the Pebas Formation and allows reconstruction of Miocene shoreline locations of South America. The Peruvian flat slab segment led to formation of the Peruvian broken foreland (PBF) and Fitzcarrald Arch in Peru and the Pampean flat slab segment led to formation of the Sierras Pampeanas mountain range in Argentina.

The subduction of a spreading centre at the Chile Triple Junction caused the uplift of Patagonia.

Eastward Miocene dynamic tilting in South America provides a mechanism for the Amazon River drainage reversal.

The rise of the Andes influenced atmospheric processes including the South American Monsoon.

=== The Himalaya ===
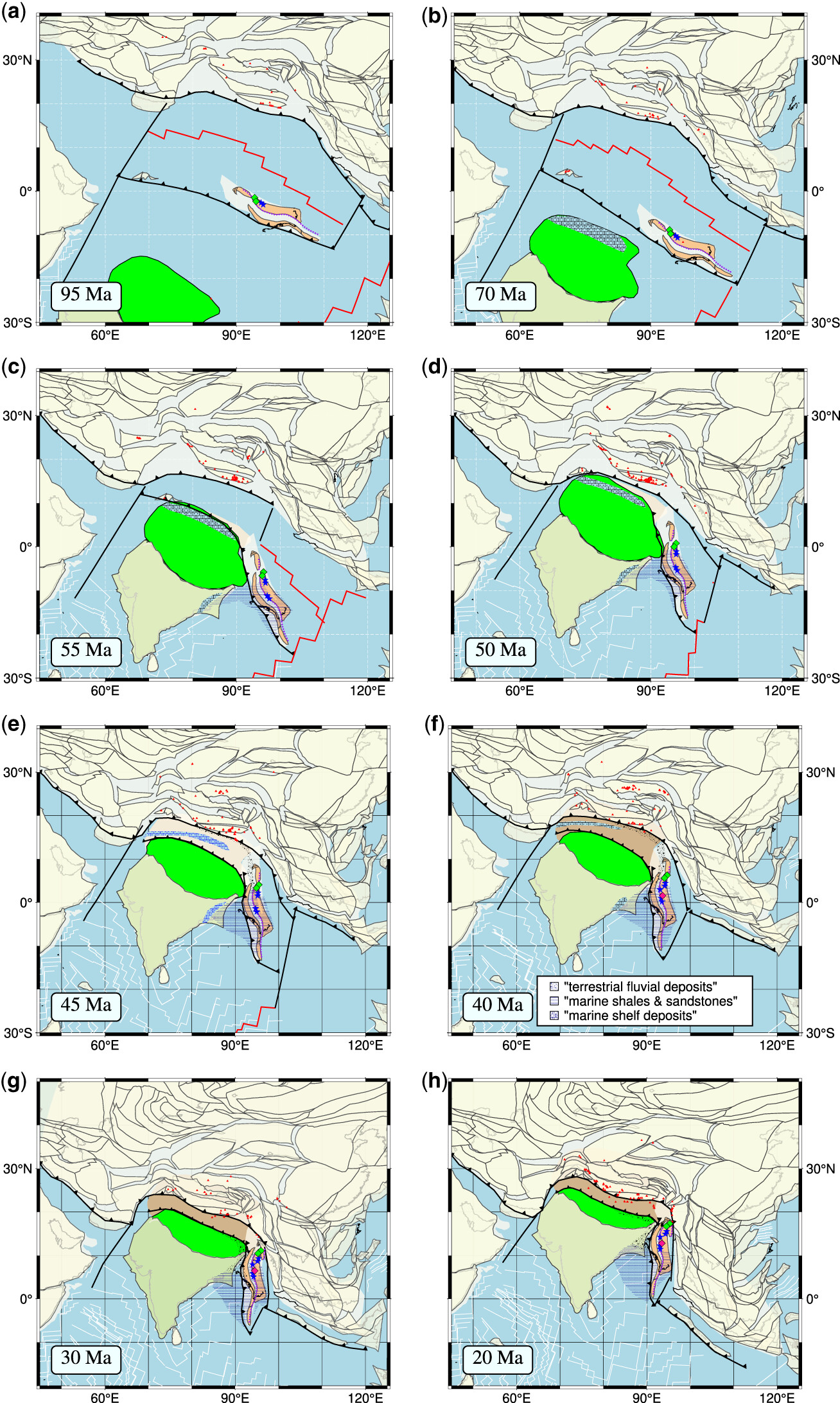
Diagram showing collision of the Indian subcontinent with Asia to form the Himalayas. The area in green represents the now subducted "Greater India"

Plate and mantle interaction caused early-mid-Miocene uplift of Himalaya and Tibetan Plateau.

The uplift of the Tibetan Plateau and Himalaya changed the sediment source of the Bengal Fan as uplift led to increased erosion and subsequent deposition of the Bengal Fan. The sediment supply rate is dependent upon the rate of erosion in the Himalaya, which is controlled by tectonics, climate, or an interaction of both. Changes in sediment source of the Bengal-Nicobar Fan in the Indian Ocean and the Indus Delta in the Arabian Sea indicate an interaction of surface processes (e.g., erosion) and climatic processes (e.g. rainfall). This is because change in sediment source areas is due to the migration of monsoon activity to the new sediment source regions causing increased rainfall and erosion in these new source areas.

In the Himalaya, correlation between the rate of exhumation and South Asian monsoon intensity has existed over the past 23 million years (after India-Asia collision). Tectonic uplift of the Himalaya and Tibetan Plateau due to the collision of India and Eurasia are directly linked to the South Asian monsoon intensification but the direction of causality is subject to debate.

==== Himalayan climate driving tectonics ====
South Asian monsoon intensification may have caused Himalayan tectonic processes. An increase in monsoon intensity caused an increase in erosion which allowed an increase in exhumation to occur via the proposed channel flow tectonic model. The channel flow model describes monsoon intensification causing denudation of the Himalaya at a 'denudation front' which causes extrusion of rock between normal and thrust faults. This extrusion explains exhumation of Himalayan rocks.

The subsequent tectonic uplift caused by exhumation reinforced the orographic effects of the climatic change and made the system interaction self-reinforcing. The pattern of the South Asian monsoon system correlates with Himalayan lithospheric processes through time including exhumation rates and thrusting activity along the Main Central Thrust of the Himalaya. Thrust migration occurred in response to a reduction in precipitation over the Himalaya to maintain critical taper of the mountain system. This supports the hypothesis that changes in climate caused changes in tectonic processes. A reduction in the amount of sediment being eroded because of changes in climate altered plate boundary stresses, and therefore tectonic processes, during orogenesis. Monsoon intensification can also explain the recent increase in India-Eurasia convergence rate (>5mm/yr) since 3.5 million years ago by causing increased erosion which shaped the geomorphology of the eastern Himalaya and decreased the elevation and crustal thickness which led to counter-clockwise rigid rotation of the Indian plate which is measured as an increase in plate motion and convergence rate.

==== Himalayan tectonics driving climate ====
The tectonic uplift of the Himalaya and Tibetan Plateau may have led to strengthening of the monsoon because the orographic barrier effect of mountain formation influenced global atmospheric circulation patterns. Propagation of the increase in Himalaya elevation from the west to east-Central Himalaya from approximately 25 to 12 million years ago may have led to simultaneous monsoon intensification as a result of this increase in elevation by tectonic processes. This can be explained by increased elevation blocking moisture-laden winds which triggered the monsoon intensification and resulted in more rapid erosion and exhumation after 24 million years ago.

Himalaya-Tibet uplift may have caused mid-Miocene global cooling because of the impact of tectonic uplift on the long-term carbon cycle. Uplift and monsoon intensification led to increased subsidence, chemical weathering rates, and organic carbon burial, which in turn caused drawdown of atmospheric carbon dioxide, therefore resulting in global cooling.

== Investigative Methods ==
Reconstructions of mountain belt paleotopography helps scientists understand the influence of mountain growth on climate and montane ecosystem biodiversity. Paleotopography is commonly analysed using § Stable isotope paleoaltimetry (e.g.,). Weathering proxies are commonly based on major-element chemical analyses (e.g., X-ray fluorescence).

Mantle and lithospheric processes and their interactions are investigated by analogue models, numerical models and seismic tomographic imaging.

Surface processes (e.g., erosion, exhumation) and their interaction with climatic processes (e.g., rainfall) have been researched through mineralogical, geochemical, thermochronometric, and seismic analysis of deposits eroded from orogens and deposited in nearby basins. Changes in sediment provenance indicates changes in surface and likely tectonic processes within mountain belts.

Evolution of climatic processes including monsoons have been analysed through the use of numerical atmospheric circulation models (e.g.,).

Impacts on biotic processes have been investigated through phylogenetic analysis (by estimation of speciation and extinction rates) of mountain-adapted species (e.g. terrestrial tetrapods including amphibians, birds, and mammals and butterflies) across mountain belts through time (e.g.,) and numerical diversification models (e.g.,).

== Challenges and difficulties ==
Whilst Earth systems have been observed to interact across mountain belts, one model of how specific Earth systems interact across one mountain belt is likely not applicable to all mountain belts due to their individual differences in geographic locations, rock composition, and tectonic structures.

=== Tectonic plate reconstructions ===
Consideration of the Earth system interactions requires complete tectonic reconstruction of all plate motions through time for the studied area, which are often not widely agreed upon, to create a framework within which Earth system interactions can be investigated.

=== Constraining the age of onset of the South Asian Monsoon ===
The age of onset of the South Asian monsoon is not widely agreed upon. The South Asian monsoon may have begun in the Early or Late Miocene. This uncertainty makes investigation into the interactions of climate with other Earth systems (especially the direction of causality) in the Himalaya through time difficult.

=== Difference in latitude and climatic conditions ===
How Earth systems interact across a mountain belt is dependent upon the mountain belts location and orientation. Different mountain belts exist at different latitudes which means that different mountain belts experience different climatic conditions including temperature and degree of glaciation (which can shape relief). This means that there will likely be different tectonic-climatic interactions involved at different mountain belts, dependent upon their latitude. Mountain belt location is a key factor in determining mountain belt elevation.

=== Difference in rock composition and tectonic structures ===
Varying crustal composition of individual mountain belts means that every mountain belt will have unique associated tectonic structures. Therefore, how tectonic processes occurring within tectonic structures interact with other Earth systems will vary between mountain belts.

== See also ==
- Climate system
- Earth system science
- Tectonic-climatic interaction
- Orographic lift
- Earth's spheres
- Natural environment
- Erosion and tectonics
