= Morro Solar Group =

- Stratigraphic range: Berriasian-Hauterivian
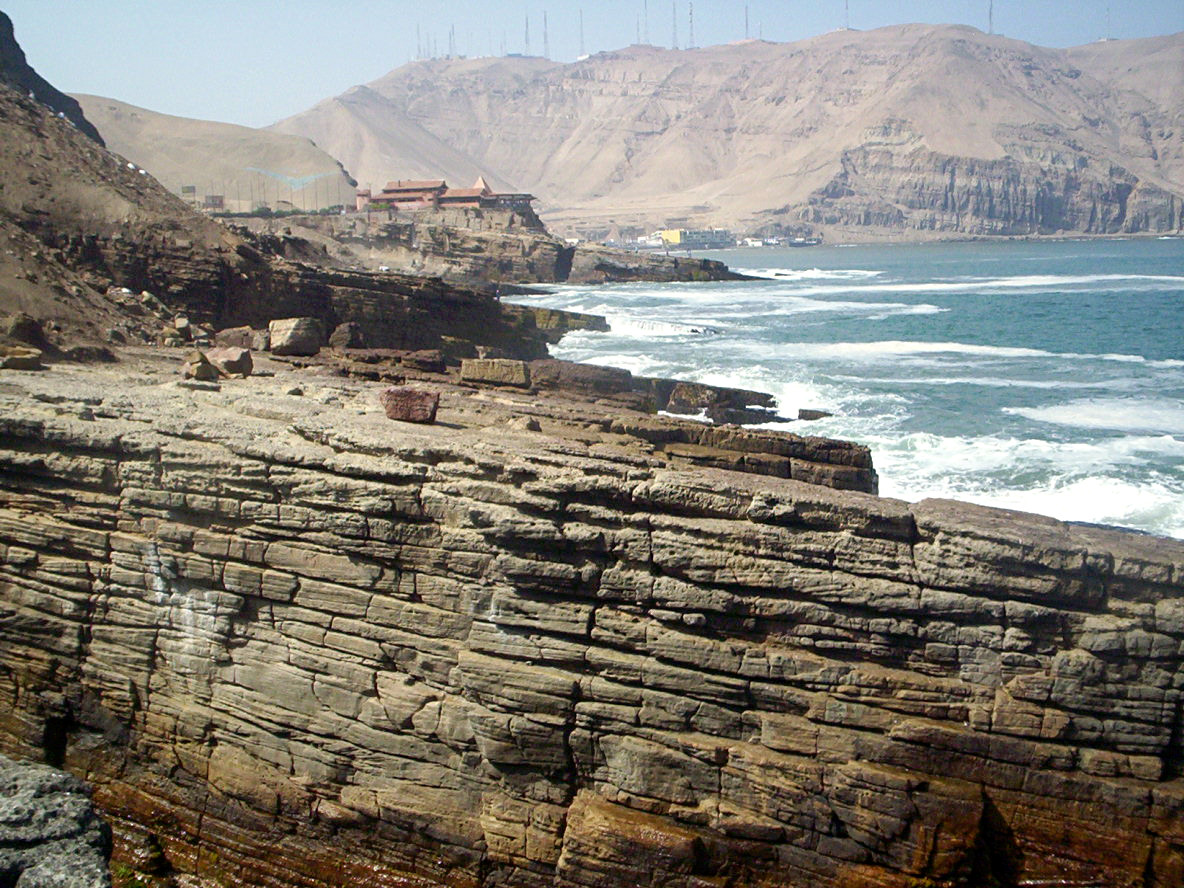
- The seaward tilting of the strata of Salto del Fraile Fm. was caused by the Andean orogeny
- Type: Geological group

Location
- Region: Lima Province
- Country: Peru

Type section
- Named for: Morro Solar

The Morro Solar Group (Spanish: Grupo Morro Solar) is a stratigraphic group of Mesozoic-aged sedimentary formations exposed near Lima, Peru. The groups formations more specifically of Berriasian and Valanginian age (Early Cretaceous) and overlies the Jurassic Puente Piedra Group and underlies the Cretaceous Pamplona Formation. The Morro Solar Group is intruded by sills of andesitic composition. Together with the Casma and Imperial Groups, the Morro Solar Group contains clastic volcanosedimentary material derivative of the Mesozoic Casma Volcanic Arc. The formations of the group hosts mostly local fossils which do not have counterparts for biochronological correlation in other regions.

== Stratigraphy ==
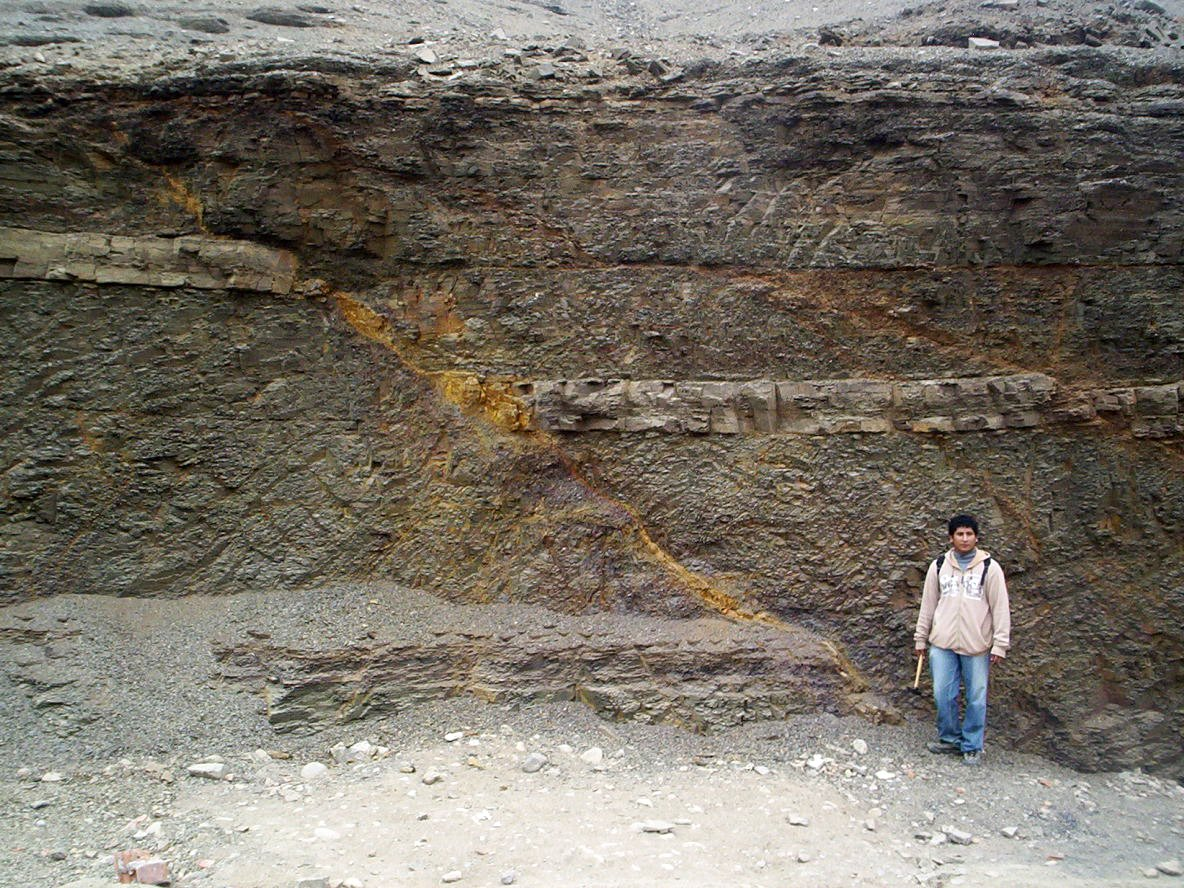
Normal fault in La Herradura Formation, Morro Solar, Peru

The formations of the Morro Solar Group are: La Herradura Formation (Spanish: Formación La Herradura), whose sediments reflect a marine near-shore deposition environment, the Valanginian Salto del Fraile Formation (Spanish: Formación Salto del Fraile), and the Marcavilca Formation (Spanish: Formación Marcavilca). The Salto del Fraile Formation is equivalent to the basal part of the Huancané Formation found further inland.
