= Coastal Batholith =

Coastal Batholith may refer to:

- Coastal Batholith of Peru formed in the Mesozoic
- Coastal Batholith of central Chile formed in the Paleozoic
