= Stratigraphy =

Study of rock layers and their formation

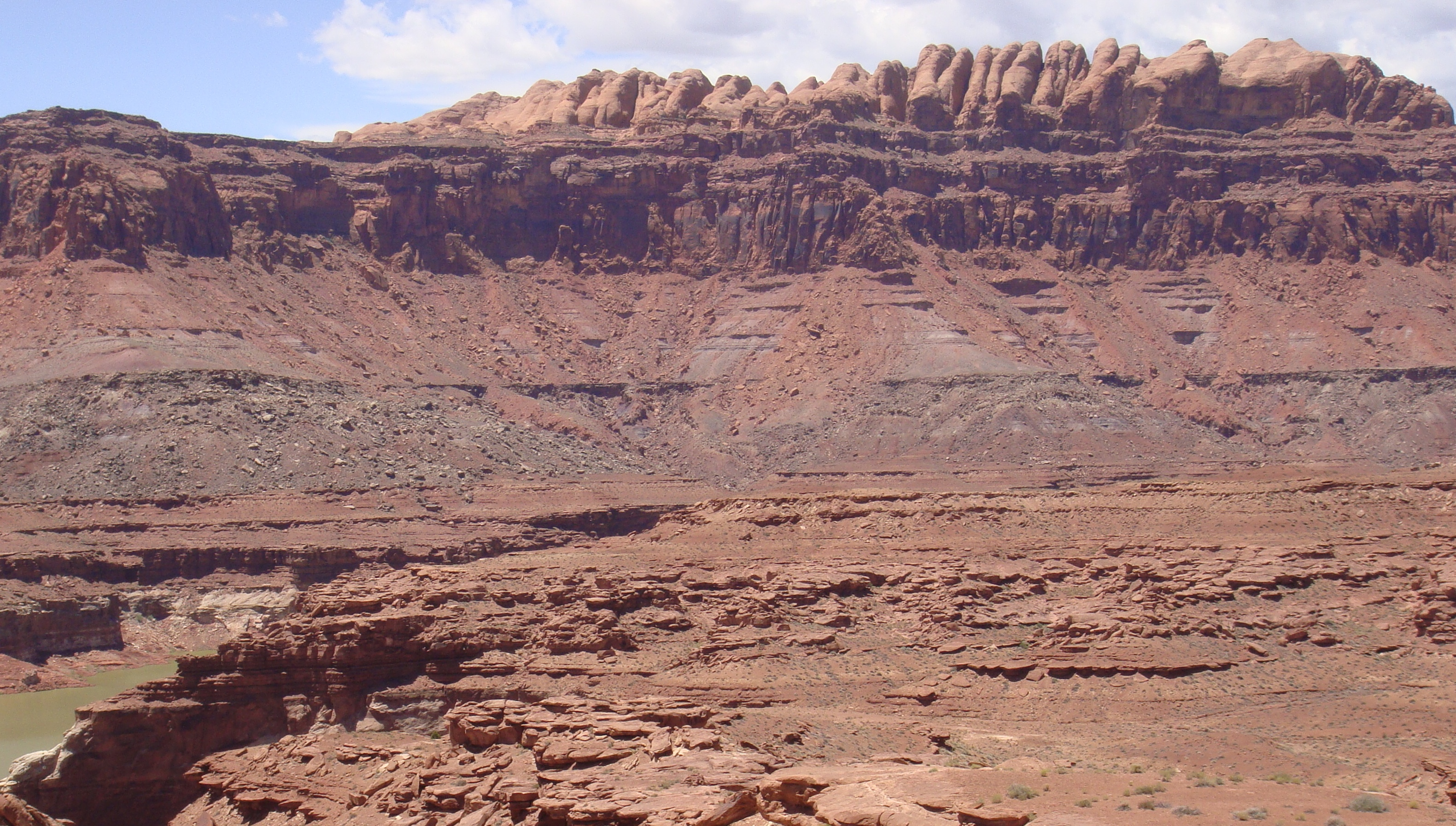
The Permian through Jurassic strata of the Colorado Plateau area of southeastern Utah demonstrate the principles of stratigraphy.

Stratigraphy is a branch of geology concerned with the study of rock layers (strata) and layering (stratification). It is primarily used in the study of sedimentary and layered volcanic rocks. Stratigraphy has three related subfields: lithostratigraphy (lithologic stratigraphy), biostratigraphy (biologic stratigraphy), and chronostratigraphy (stratigraphy by age).

Several principles and laws come into play when using stratigraphy such as Principle of original horizontality, Law of superposition, Cross-cutting relationships, Principle of inclusions, Principle of faunal succession.

== Historical development ==
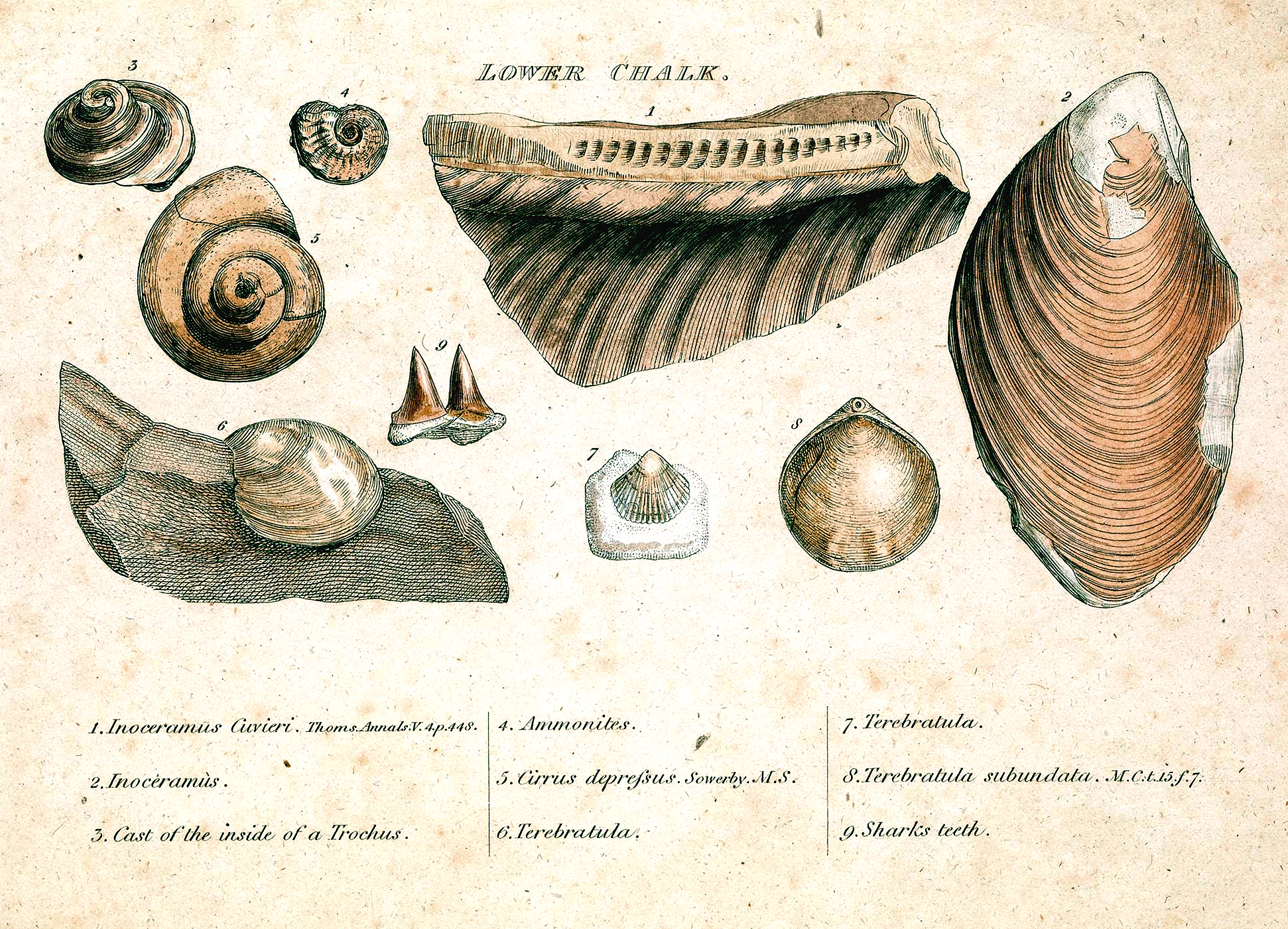
Engraving from William Smith's monograph on identifying strata based on fossils

Catholic priest Nicholas Steno established the theoretical basis for stratigraphy when he introduced the law of superposition, the principle of original horizontality and the principle of lateral continuity in a 1669 work on the fossilization of organic remains in layers of sediment. In 1759 the Italian geologist Giovanni Arduino proposed the division of the earth's crust into four general and successive orders: Primary, Secondary, Tertiary and Quaternary, a classification regarded as the starting point for modern stratigraphy.

The first practical large-scale application of stratigraphy was by William Smith in the 1790s and early 19th century. Known as the "Father of English geology", Smith recognized the significance of strata or rock layering and the importance of fossil markers for correlating strata; he created the first geological map of England. Other influential applications of stratigraphy in the early 19th century were by Georges Cuvier and Alexandre Brongniart, who studied the geology of the region around Paris.

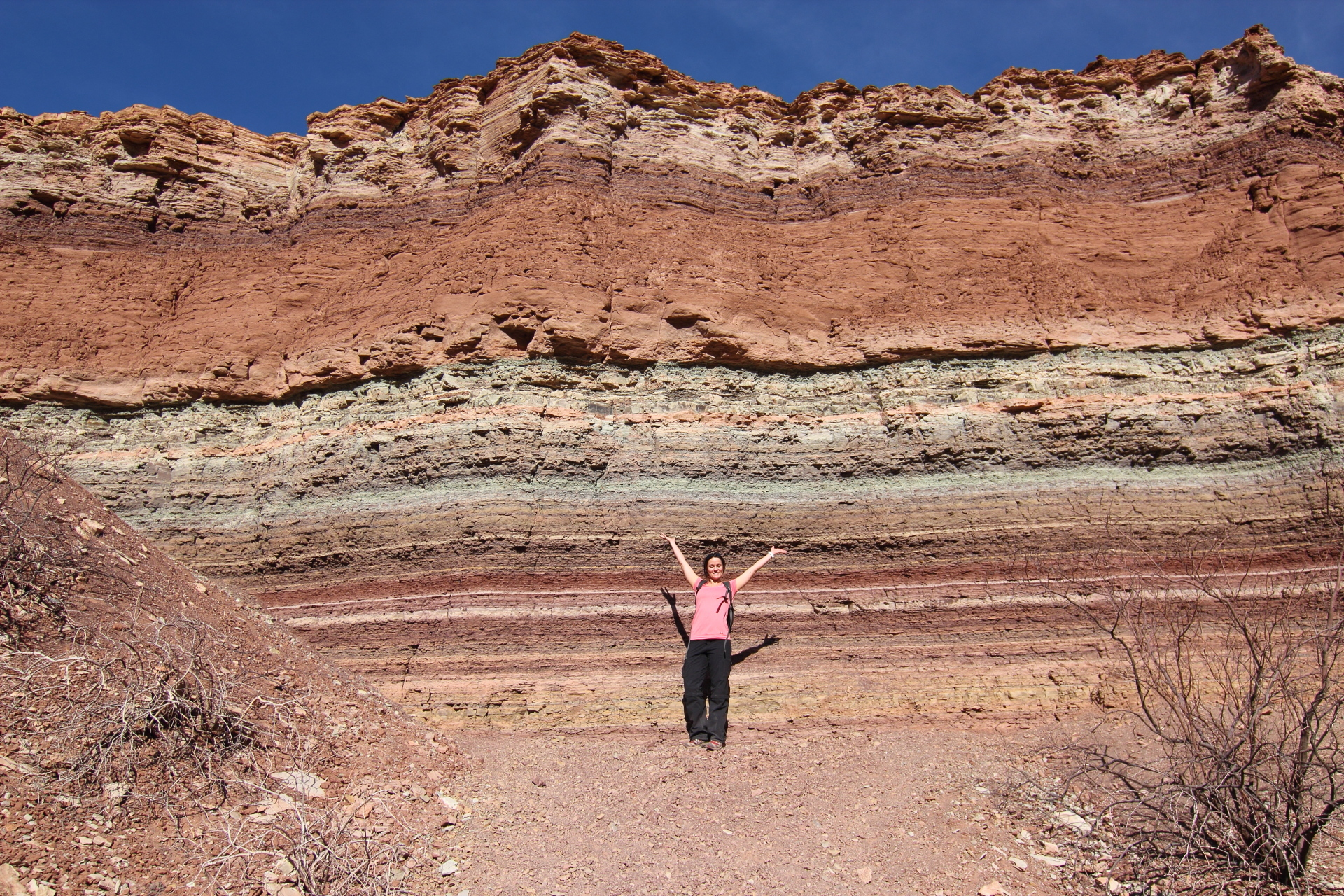
Strata in Cafayate (Argentina)

== Lithostratigraphy ==
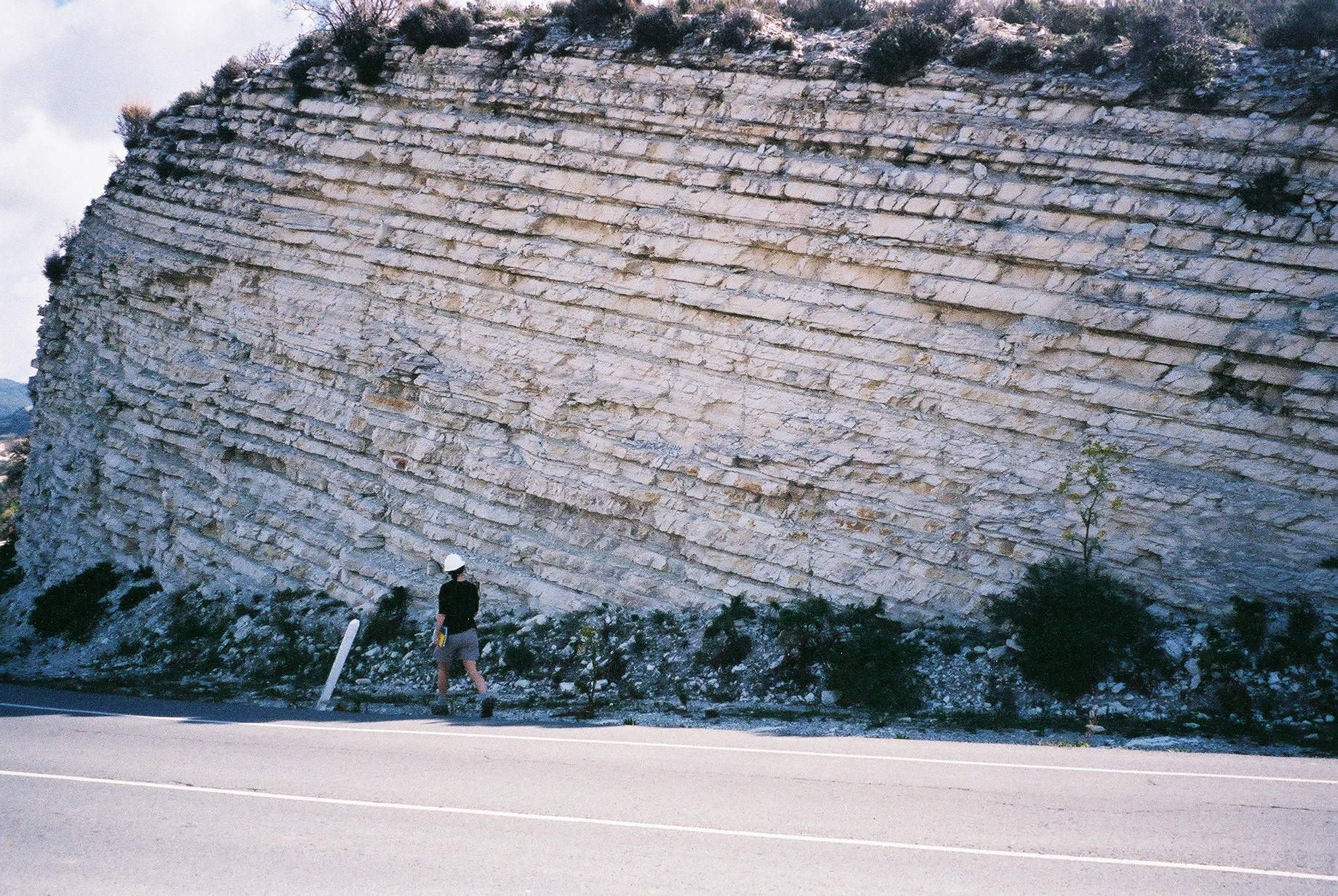
Chalk layers in Cyprus, showing sedimentary layering

Variation in rock units, most obviously displayed as visible layering, is due to physical contrasts in rock type (lithology). This variation can occur vertically as layering (bedding), or laterally, and reflects changes in environments of deposition (known as facies change). These variations provide a lithostratigraphy or lithologic stratigraphy of the rock unit. Key concepts in stratigraphy involve understanding how certain geometric relationships between rock layers arise and what these geometries imply about their original depositional environment. The basic concept in stratigraphy, called the law of superposition, states: in an undeformed stratigraphic sequence, the oldest strata occur at the base of the sequence.

Chemostratigraphy studies the changes in the relative proportions of trace elements and isotopes within and between lithologic units. Carbon and oxygen isotope ratios vary with time, and researchers can use those to map subtle changes that occurred in the paleoenvironment. This has led to the specialized field of isotopic stratigraphy.

Cyclostratigraphy documents the often cyclic changes in the relative proportions of minerals (particularly carbonates), grain size, thickness of sediment layers (varves) and fossil diversity with time, related to seasonal or longer term changes in palaeoclimates.

== Biostratigraphy ==
Biostratigraphy or palaeontologic stratigraphy is based on fossil evidence in the rock layers. Strata from widespread locations containing the same fossil fauna and flora are said to be correlatable in time. Biologic stratigraphy was based on William Smith's principle of faunal succession, which predated, and was one of the first and most powerful lines of evidence for, biological evolution. It provides strong evidence for the formation (speciation) and extinction of species. The geologic time scale was developed during the 19th century, based on the evidence of biologic stratigraphy and faunal succession. This timescale remained a relative scale until the development of radiometric dating, which was based on an absolute time framework, leading to the development of chronostratigraphy.

One important development is the Vail curve, which attempts to define a global historical sea-level curve according to inferences from worldwide stratigraphic patterns. Stratigraphy is also commonly used to delineate the nature and extent of hydrocarbon-bearing reservoir rocks, seals, and traps of petroleum geology.

== Chronostratigraphy ==
Chronostratigraphy is the branch of stratigraphy concerned with arranging rock units into relative temporal ordering, so that a sequence of time-relative events that created the rocks formation can be derived. The ultimate aim of chronostratigraphy is to place dates on the sequence of deposition of all rocks within a geological region, and then to every region, and by extension to provide an entire geologic record of the Earth.

A gap or missing strata in the geological record of an area is called a stratigraphic hiatus. This may be the result of a halt in the deposition of sediment. Alternatively, the gap may be due to removal by erosion, in which case it may be called a stratigraphic vacuity. It is called a hiatus because deposition was on hold for a period of time. A physical gap may represent both a period of non-deposition and a period of erosion. A geologic fault may cause the appearance of a hiatus.

=== Magnetostratigraphy ===
Example of magnetostratigraphy. Magnetic stripes are the result of reversals of the Earth's magnetic poles and seafloor spreading. New oceanic crust is magnetized as it forms and then it moves away from the midocean ridge in both directions.

Magnetostratigraphy is a chronostratigraphic technique used to date sedimentary and volcanic sequences. The method works by collecting oriented samples at measured intervals throughout a section. The samples are analyzed to determine their detrital remanent magnetism (DRM), that is, the polarity of Earth's magnetic field at the time a stratum was deposited. For sedimentary rocks this is possible because, as they fall through the water column, very fine-grained magnetic minerals (< 17 μm) behave like tiny compasses, orienting themselves with Earth's magnetic field. Upon burial, that orientation is preserved. For volcanic rocks, magnetic minerals, which form in the melt, orient themselves with the ambient magnetic field, and are fixed in place upon crystallization of the lava.

Oriented paleomagnetic core samples are collected in the field; mudstones, siltstones, and very fine-grained sandstones are the preferred lithologies because the magnetic grains are finer and more likely to orient with the ambient field during deposition. If the ancient magnetic field were oriented similarly to today's field (North Magnetic Pole near the North Rotational Pole), the strata would retain a normal polarity. If the data indicate that the North Magnetic Pole were near the South Rotational Pole, the strata would exhibit reversed polarity.

Results of the individual samples are analyzed by removing the natural remanent magnetization (NRM) to reveal the DRM. Following statistical analysis, the results are used to generate a local magnetostratigraphic column that can then be compared against the Global Magnetic Polarity Time Scale.

This technique is used to date sequences that generally lack fossils or interbedded igneous rocks. The continuous nature of the sampling means that it is also a powerful technique for the estimation of sediment-accumulation rates.

== See also ==
- Assise
- Bed (geology)
- Conodont biostratigraphy
- Erygmascope (old instrument for studying strata)
- Harris matrix
- International Commission on Stratigraphy
- Key bed
- Sadler effect
- Sedimentary basin analysis
- Sequence stratigraphy
- Stratigraphy (archaeology)
- Tectonostratigraphy
