= Sadler effect =

The Sadler effect describes variation in apparent sediment accumulation rates and bed thicknesses back through time inherent to the geological sedimentary record. Peter Sadler analyzed the expected structure in a stratigraphic section under the hypothesis that bigger geological events–episodes of deposition, erosion, and the gaps between those events–are rarer. He showed that under these conditions, it is inevitable that, on average, thinner stratigraphic sections, which cover shorter amounts of time, record faster accumulation rates than thicker sections, which record longer amounts of time.

The effect equivalently states that more ancient packages of sediment in the stratigraphic record will record slower sedimentation rates stretched over longer periods of time. For instance, it explains that in general, the more ancient geological periods of the Phanerozoic are longer than the more recent ones; i.e., the periods of the Palaeozoic are much longer than those in the Cenozoic. Conversely, it also explains that the maximum sediment accumulation rates seen in the Cambrian at the start of the Phanerozoic are almost two orders of magnitude lower than those observed in the Quaternary, at its end.

The Sadler effect provides a powerful framework for understanding how information extracted from any given stratigraphic section differs from what should be expected under constant conditions – that is, it provides a null hypothesis for analysing stratigraphy. It also provides techniques to estimate the completeness of a given stratigraphic section on a given timescale. Sections are less complete at shorter timescales, which means that at sufficiently short timescales and for some purposes, some sedimentary successions may contain essentially no useful information.

For example, the Sadler effect has since been used to investigate whether apparent increases in global sedimentation rates across the last 5 Ma are real; how the record of sediments deposited on continental margins may be read; to interpret fluvial processes such as river avulsion; and to understand what information, and which processes at what timescales, can be preserved in sediments.

== See also ==
- Sedimentology
- Sequence stratigraphy
- Tectonic–climatic interaction
