= La Herradura Formation =

Sedimentary formation in Peru

- Stratigraphic range: Hauterivian
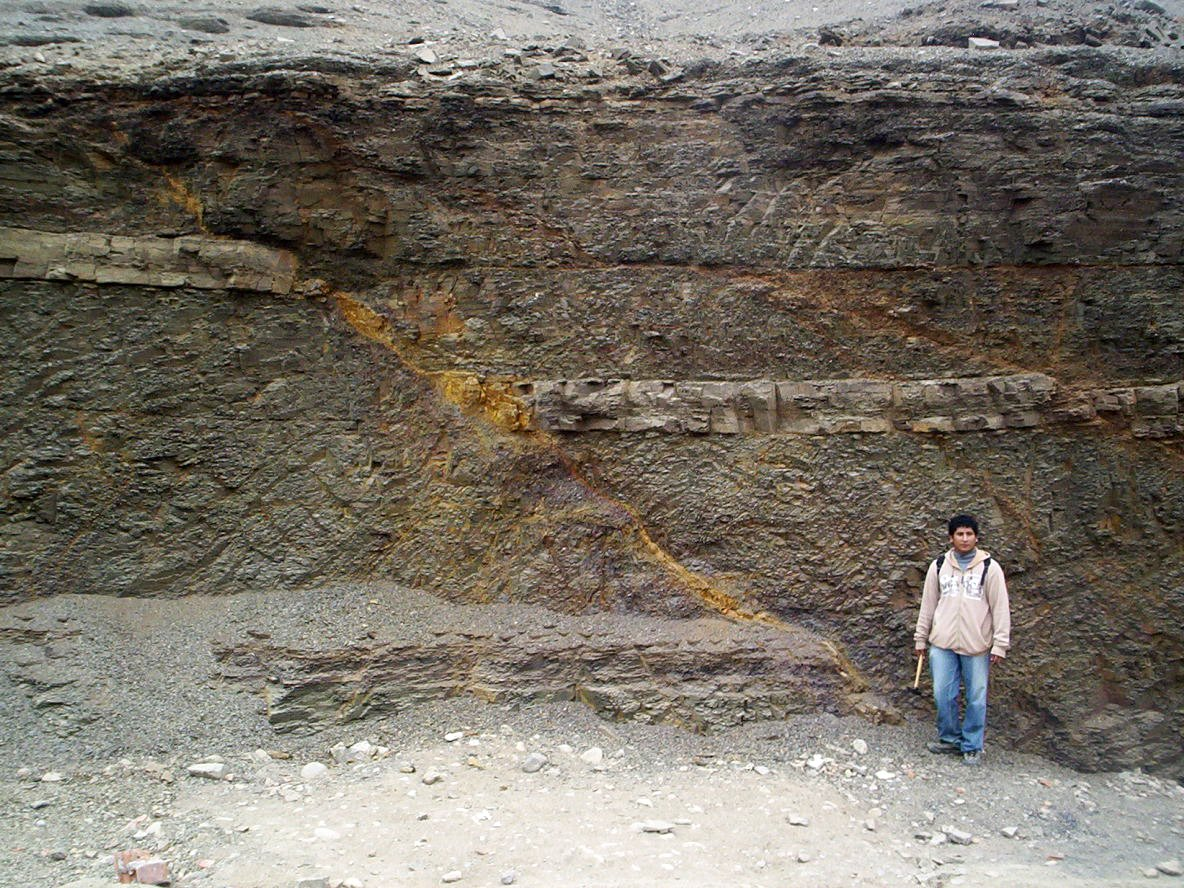
- Normal fault in La Herradura Formation, Morro Solar, Peru
- Type: Geological formation
- Unit of: Morro Solar Group
- Underlies: Salto del Fraile Formation
- Overlies: Puente Piedra Group

Location
- Region: Lima Province
- Country: Peru

La Herradura Formation (Spanish: Formación La Herradura) is a sedimentary formation of Lower Cretaceous age exposed near the beach of the same name in Lima, Peru. The sediments of the formation reflect a marine near-shore depositional environment.
