= Cordillera Blanca Batholith =

Geologic formation in Peru

The Cordillera Blanca Batholith (Spanish: Batolito de la Cordillera Blanca) is an extensive group of individual plutons that crop out near or at Cordillera Blanca, Peru. The batholith intrudes the Jurassic Chicama Formation. To the west the Cordillera Blanca Fault makes up the border of the batholith. It has been suggested that the magma that originated the batholith was the product of partial melting of underplated basaltic crust.

== See also ==
- Casma Group
- Coastal Batholith of Peru
