= Downcutting =

Process of deepening a stream channel by erosion of the bottom material

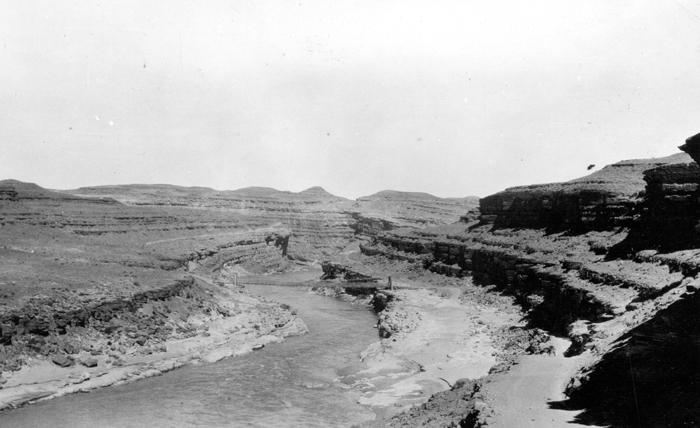
Several stages of downcutting by the San Juan River in Utah can be identified in this 1927 photo. Remnants of former floodplains stand as terraces above the river's modern level.

Downcutting, also called erosional downcutting, downward erosion or vertical erosion, is a geological process by hydraulic action that deepens the channel of a stream or valley by removing material from the stream bed or the valley floor. The speed of downcutting depends on the stream's base level, the lowest point to which the stream can erode. Sea level is the ultimate base level, but many streams have a higher "temporary" base level because they empty into another body of water that is above sea level or encounter bedrock that resists erosion.

A concurrent process called lateral erosion is the widening of a stream channel or valley. When a stream is high above its base level, downcutting will take place faster than lateral erosion; but as the level of the stream approaches its base level, the rate of lateral erosion increases. This is why streams in mountainous areas tend to be narrow and swift, forming V-shaped valleys, while streams in lowland areas tend to be wide and slow-moving, with valleys that are correspondingly wide and flat-bottomed.

The stream gradient is the ratio between the elevation drop of a stream and the horizontal distance considered. The steeper the gradient, the faster the stream flows. Sometimes geological uplift will increase the gradient of a stream even while the stream downcuts toward its base level, a process called rejuvenation. This happened in the case of the Colorado River in the western United States, resulting in the process that created the Grand Canyon.

== Lake bed downcutting ==
Lake bed downcutting is the erosion of cohesive material such as clay or glacial till from a shoreline by wave action. When the sand cover is stripped away and the cohesive layer is exposed, cohesive material is lost to the water column. Unlike sand, cohesive material cannot be replenished by natural events such as bluff erosion. This can result in a process called "bluff recession," in which waves erode and carry away the material at the toe of the bluff and cause it to become steeper. When the slope reaches a certain angle, the bluff becomes unstable and fails, causing it to recede inland.
