= Cordillera Blanca Fault Zone =

System of geological faults in the Peruvian Andes

The Cordillera Blanca Fault Zone (Spanish: Falla Cordillera Blanca) is a system of geological faults located next to Cordillera Blanca in the northern Peruvian Andes. The fault is considered the most active one in northern Peru. The last time the fault ruptured was in the 1500s or before. The fault zone forms the western boundary of Cordillera Blanca Batholith.
