= Fluvial terrace =

Elongated terraces that flank the sides of floodplains and river valleys

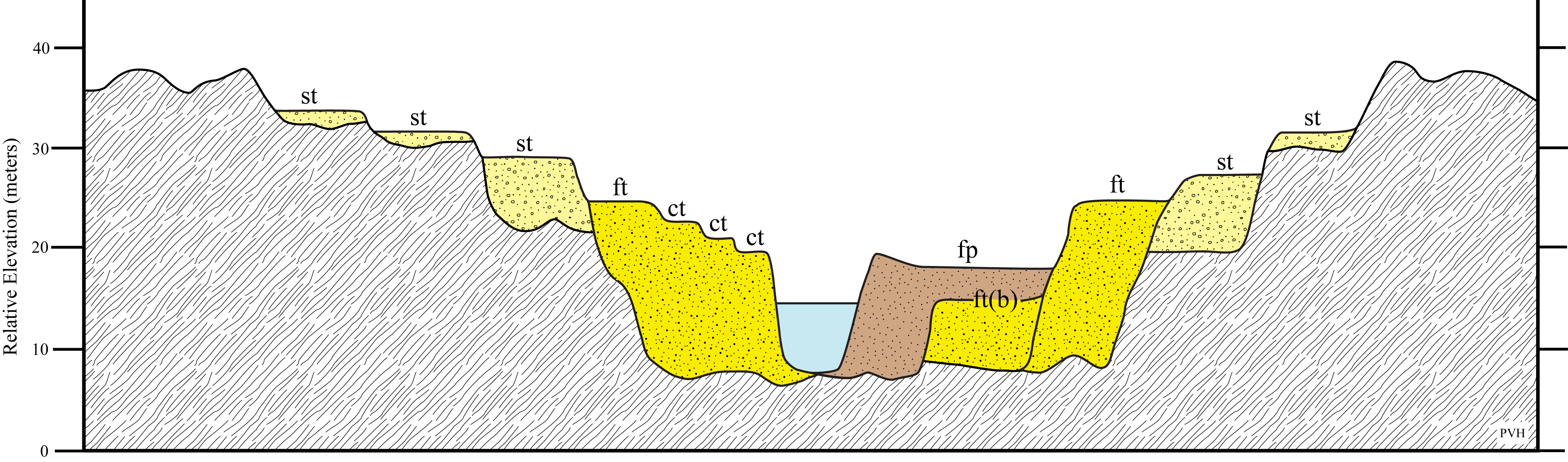
Hypothetical valley cross-section illustrating a complex sequence of aggradational (fill) and degradational (cut and strath) terraces. Note ct = cut terrace, ft = fill terrace, ft(b) = buried fill terrace, fp = active floodplain, and st = strath terrace.

Fluvial terraces are elongated terraces that flank the sides of floodplains and fluvial valleys all over the world. They consist of a relatively level strip of land, called a "tread", separated from either an adjacent floodplain, other fluvial terraces, or uplands by distinctly steeper strips of land called "risers". These terraces lie parallel to and above the river channel and its floodplain. Because of the manner in which they form, fluvial terraces are underlain by fluvial sediments of highly variable thickness. River terraces are the remnants of earlier floodplains that existed at a time when either a stream or river was flowing at a higher elevation before its channel downcut to create a new floodplain at a lower elevation. Changes in elevation can be due to changes in the base level (elevation of the lowest point in the fluvial system, usually the drainage basin) of the fluvial system, which leads to headward erosion along the length of either a stream or river, gradually lowering its elevation. For example, downcutting by a river can lead to increased velocity of a tributary, causing that tributary to erode toward its headwaters. Terraces can also be left behind when the volume of the fluvial flow declines due to changes in climate, typical of areas which were covered by ice during periods of glaciation, and their adjacent drainage basins.

== Types ==
There are two basic types of fluvial terraces, fill terraces and strath terraces. Fill terraces sometimes are further subdivided into nested fill terraces and cut terraces. Both fill and strath terraces are, at times, described as being either paired or unpaired terraces based upon the relative elevations of the surface of these terraces.

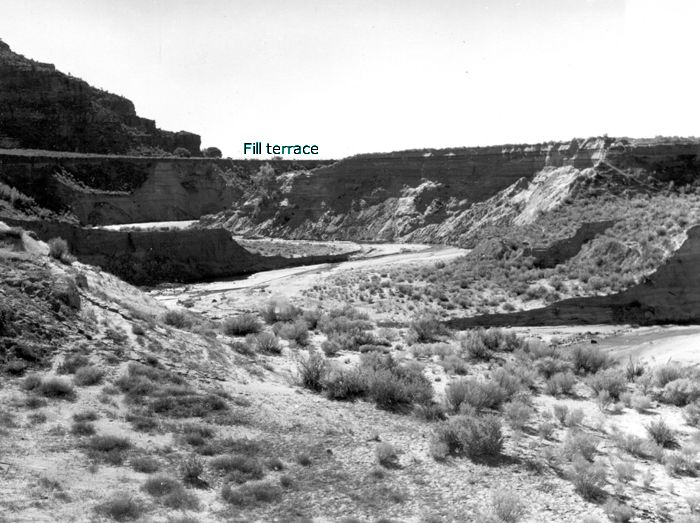
Eroded alluvial fill 60 feet (18 m) thick at Kanab Creek, Kane County, Utah. In 1884 the stream ran at top of the terrace. 1939 photo by United States Geological Survey.

Fill terraces
Fill terraces are the result of an existing valley being filled with alluvium. The valley may fill with alluvium for many different reasons including: an influx in bed load due to glaciation or change in stream power which causes the valley, that was down cut by either a stream or river, to be filled in with material. The stream or river will continue to deposit material until an equilibrium is reached and it can transport the material rather than deposit it. This equilibrium may last for a very short period, such as, after glaciation, or for a very long time if the conditions do not change. The fill terrace is created when the conditions change again and either a stream or river starts to incise into the material that it deposited in the valley. Once this occurs benches composed completely of alluvium form on the sides of the valley. The upper most benches are the fill terraces. As it continues to cut down through the alluvium the fill terraces are left above the river channel (sometimes 100 m or more). The fill terrace is only the very highest terrace resulting from the depositional episode; if there are multiple terraces below the fill terrace, these are called "cut terraces".

Cut terraces
Cut terraces, also called "cut-in-fill" terraces, are similar to the fill terraces mentioned above, but they are erosional in origin. Once the alluvium deposited in the valley has begun to erode and fill terraces form along the valley walls, cut terraces may also form below the fill terraces. As either a stream or river continues to incise into the material, multiple levels of terraces may form. The uppermost being the fill terraces and the remaining lower terraces are cut terraces.

Nested fill terraces
Nested fill terraces are the result of the valley filling with alluvium, the alluvium being incised, and the valley filling again with material but to a lower level than before. The terrace that results for the second filling is a nested terrace because it has been "nested" into the original alluvium and created a terrace. These terraces are depositional in origin and may be able to be identified by a sudden change in alluvium characteristics such as finer material.

Strath terraces
Strath terraces are the result of either a stream or river downcutting through bedrock. As the flow continues to downcut, a period or periods of overall lower valley widening may nonetheless occur. This may occur due to an equilibrium reached in the fluvial system resulting from: slowed or paused uplift, climate change, or a change in the bedrock type. Once downcutting continues the flattened valley bottom composed of bedrock (overlain with a possible thin layer of alluvium) is left above either a stream or river channel. These bedrock terraces are the strath terraces and are erosional in nature.

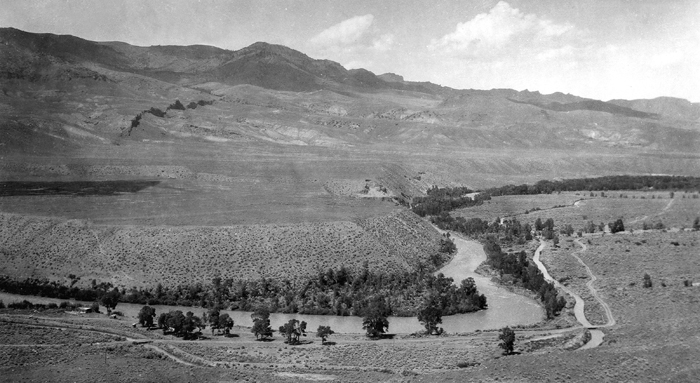
Unpaired fluvial terraces on the South Fork of the Shoshone River, Park County, Wyoming, 1923. The river at left has encountered a formation of erosion-resistant volcanic breccia, causing it to downcut more rapidly on the right, leaving terraces of different elevations.

Paired and unpaired terraces
Terraces of the same elevation on opposite sides of either a stream or river are called paired terraces. They occur when it downcuts evenly on both sides and terraces on one side of the river correspond in height with those on the other side. Paired terraces are caused by river rejuvenation. Unpaired terraces occur when either a stream or river encounters material on one side that resists erosion, leaving a single terrace with no corresponding terrace on the resistant side.

== Formation ==
Terraces can be formed in many ways and in several geologic and environmental settings. By studying the size, shape, and age of terraces, one can determine the geologic processes that formed them.

Long-lived river (fluvial) systems can produce a series of terrace surfaces over the course of their geologic lifetime. When rivers flood, sediment deposits in sheets across the floodplain and build up over time. Later, during a time of river erosion, this sediment is cut into, or incised, by the river and flushed downstream. The previous floodplain is therefore abandoned and becomes a river terrace. A river terrace is composed of an abandoned surface, or tread, and the incised surface, or riser.

== Age determination ==
A series of terraces along a river. The oldest terraces (T1) are higher standing than the younger terraces (T3). The present floodplain (T4) will soon become the youngest terrace surface as the river incises.

Fluvial terraces can be used to measure the rate at which either a stream or river is downcutting its valley. A simple calculation of h_{1}/t_{1} can give the average rate of incision(r_{i}), where h_{i} = height of river terrace from river and t_{i} = age of surface.

Dating of the abandoned terrace surfaces (treads) is possible using a variety of geochronologic techniques. The type of technique used, however, is dependent on the composition and age of the terraces. Currently used techniques are magnetostratigraphy, low temperature thermochronology, cosmogenic nuclides, radiocarbon, thermoluminescence, optically stimulated luminescence, and U-Th disequilibria. Additionally, if there is a succession of preserved fossils, biostratigraphy can be used.

Using the resulting date and the elevation above its current level, an approximate average rate of downcutting can be determined. These rates of incision assume a constant rate of incision over the entire height and time.

=== Incision versus aggradation ===
The ages of incision and flooding (aggradation) can have different interpretations for each fluvial system, where each region may respond independently to external variation. Many variables control the behavior of the river and whether it erodes or floods. Changes in the steepness of the stream gradient, the amount of sediment contained in the river, and the total amount of water flowing through the system, all influence how a river behaves. There is a delicate equilibrium that controls a river system, which, when disturbed, causes flooding and incising events to occur and produce terracing.

== Climate and tectonics ==
When terraces have the same age and/or shape over a region, it is often indicative that a large-scale geologic or environmental mechanism is responsible. Tectonic uplift and climate change are viewed as dominant mechanisms that can shape the earth's surface through erosion. River terraces can be influenced by one or both of these forcing mechanisms and therefore can be used to study variation in tectonics, climate, and erosion, and how these processes interact.

=== Scale of observation ===
Scale of observation is always a factor when evaluating tectonic and climatic forcing. At a glimpse in geologic time, one of these forcing mechanisms may look to be the dominant process. Observations made on long geologic times scales (≥10^{6}annum) typically reveal much about slower, larger-magnitude geologic processes such as tectonism from a regional to even global scale. Evaluation on geologically short time scales (10^{3}-10^{5} a) can reveal much about the relatively shorter climatic cycles, local to regional erosion, and how they could drive terrace development. Regional periods of terrace formation likely mark a time of when stream erosion was much greater than sediment accumulation. River erosion can be driven by tectonic uplift, climate, or potentially both mechanisms. It is difficult in many areas, however, to decisively pinpoint whether tectonism or climate change can individually drive tectonic uplift, enhanced erosion, and therefore terrace formation. In many cases, tectonic-climate interactions occur together in a positive feedback cycle.

=== Climatic changes ===
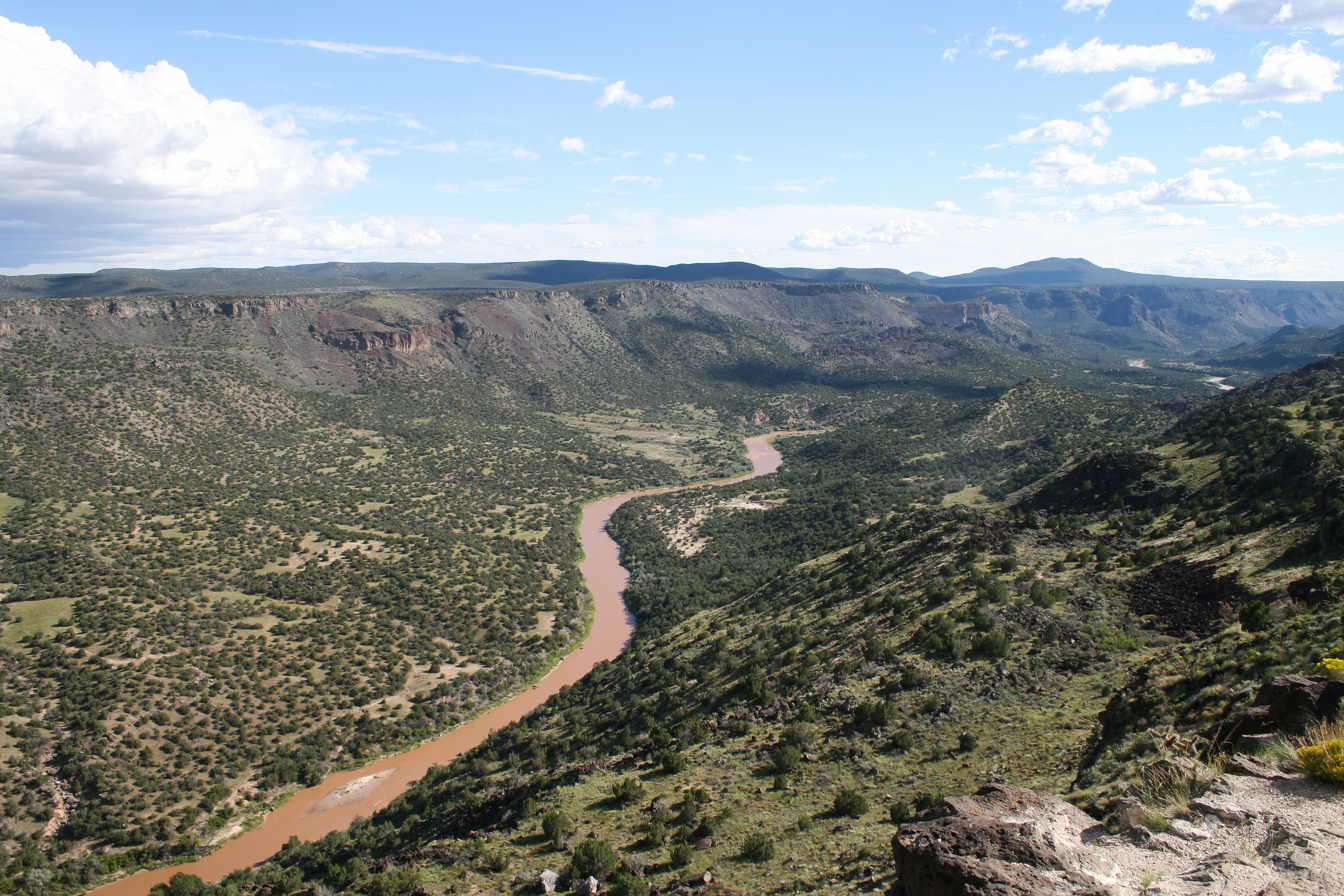
The Rio Grande, flowing down through the Rio Grande Rift for the last several million years. The last stage of incision by the river is thought to be driven by the Milankovitch eccentricity cycle. Increased precipitation and sediment supply drove incision of the high standing terraces, beginning at ~800ka.

Rivers in continental interiors that have not experienced tectonic activity in the geological recent history likely record climatic changes through terracing. Terraces record natural, periodic variations driven by cycles such as the Milankovitch cycle. These cycles can describe how the Earth's orbit and rotational wobble vary over time. The Milankovitch cycles, along with solar forcing, have been determined to drive periodic environmental change on a global scale, namely between glacial and interglacial environments. Each river system will respond to these climate variations on a regional scale. In addition, the regional environment will determine how change in sediment and precipitation will drive river incision and aggradation. Terraces along the river will record the cyclic changes, where glacial and interglacial time periods are associated with either incision or aggradation.

=== Tectonic uplift ===
In areas where there is tectonic uplift, it can increase the slope of a river, increasing its flow rate and erosive power. This can cause a river to abandon its floodplain and cut downward into its bed. The abandoned floodplain then becomes a terrace above the new river level. If the tectonic uplift occurs episodically, the river may form multiple terraces. When there is prolonged uplift, rivers often cut into bedrock. In subsequent periods of equilibrium, the river bed widens to produce a strath. Cycles of such erosion produce strath terraces. Alternatively, uplift can trigger incision into alluvium previously deposited by the river, which causes a fill terrace to be formed.

=== Tectonic–climatic interactions ===
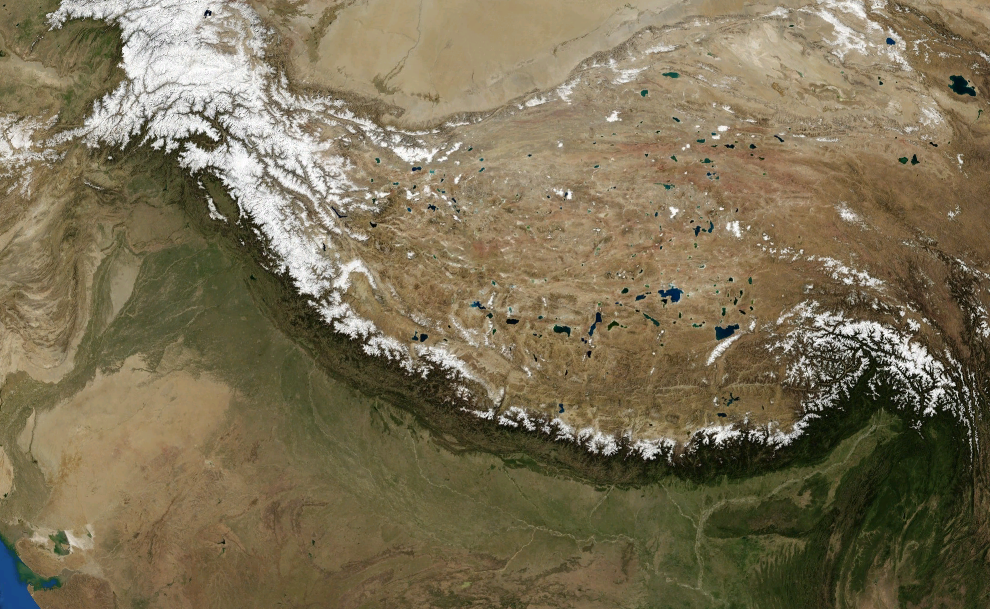
A satellite image of the Himalayas and the rainshadow effect. Development of the Himalayan front and South Asian Monsoon is thought to be driven by tectonic-climatic interactions.

Tectonic uplift and climatic factors interact as a positive feedback system, where each forcing mechanism drives the other. One example of this feedback between tectonic and climatic effects may be preserved in the Himalayan front and in the development of the rain shadow effect and the Asian monsoon.

The Himalayas act as an orographic barrier that can impede atmospheric circulation and moving air masses. When these air masses try to move up and over the Himalaya, they are forced up against the barrier. The mass condenses as it rises, releasing moisture, which results in precipitation on that flank of the mountains. The condensation of the water vapor warms the air. The resulting drier air gets compressed and further warmed on the other side of the barrier, which can produce desert conditions downwind. This is known as the rain shadow effect. In the Himalaya, the rain shadow is an important environmental factor in developing the Asian monsoon. The Asian monsoon then increases erosion on the southern steep slopes of the Himalaya.

Tectonic uplift during the creation of high mountainous regions can produce incredible surface elevations and therefore exposure of rocks to wind and water. High precipitation can drive enhanced erosion of the exposed rocks and lead to rapid denudation of sediment from the mountains. Buoyancy of the crust, or isostasy, will then drive further tectonic uplift, in order to achieve equilibrium, as sediment is continuously stripped from the top. Enhanced uplift will then create higher topography, drive increased precipitation which will concentrate erosion, and further uplift.

The interaction between tectonics and climate leads to more complex formation of river terraces, especially in the Himalaya and Tibetan Plateau.

== See also ==
- Bench (geology) – Long, relatively narrow land bounded by distinctly steeper slopes above and below
- Landform – Feature of the solid surface of a planetary body
- Musashino Terrace – Large tableland in Kantō region, Japan
