= Marañón fold and thrust belt =

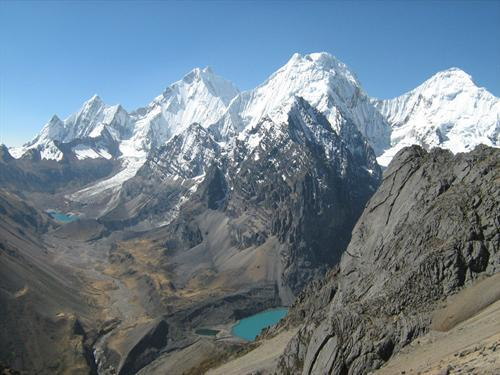
The folded strata in Cordillera Huayhuash seen in picture form part of the Marañón fold and thrust belt

The Marañón fold and thrust belt (Spanish: faja corrida y plegada del Marañón) is a 1,000 kilometres (620 mi) long, northwest–southeast trending belt of deformed rocks located in the Andes of central Peru. The formation of the belt defines the Incaic Phase of the Andean orogeny. (Note: The Incaic Phase is one of the main structural events in central Peru defined originally in a 1929 posthumous publication of Gustav Steinmann (1856–1929).)

Prior to the deformation and uplift the rocks forming the Marañón fold and thrust belt constituted the fill of a marine back-arc basin that existed in the Mesozoic and was parallel to the present-day coast. The west-dipping Chonta Fault existed as a normal fault within this basin and allowed continued basin subsidence and sediment accumulation in the Mesozoic. The onset of Andean orogeny first caused the basin to rise and dry up with red beds being deposited in its eastern part. Then the sedimentary basin was subject of a complete basin inversion. During deformation Chonta Fault acted as a barrier "damming-up" folded and thrust strata west of it. This makes the fault define the limits of two different styles of thin-skinned deformation within the belt. The fault was reactivated as an inverse fault during basin inversion in the Eocene.

== Erosion, mineralization, intrusion and burial ==
The unconformity that cuts across the Marañón fold and thrust belt show the Incaic Phase of the Andean orogeny ended no later than 33 million years ago in the earliest Oligocene. Above this unconformity the belt is overlain by volcanic rocks of Late Eocene to Miocene age. The parts of the belt are intruded by plutons of the Coastal Batholith of Peru. There are various mineralizations of base metals and precious metals in the belt, being particularly common along Chonta Fault. Most mineralizations are either of epithermal, porphyry or skarn type. The most common ore metals in the mineralizations of the belt are zinc, copper, gold, lead, tungsten and silver.
