= Casma Group =

Group of geologic formations in Peru

- Stratigraphic range: Albian-Cenomanian
- Type: Geological group

Lithology
- Primary: Limestone, marl, sandstone, conglomerate
- Other: Gypsum, tuff

Location
- Coordinates: 10.9°S 76.8°W
- Region: Casma Province, Ancash Region
- Country: Peru
- Extent: West Peruvian Basin

Type section
- Named for: Casma
- Casma Group (Peru)

The Casma Group (Spanish: Grupo Casma) is a stratigraphic group of Cretaceous (Albian to Cenomanian) sedimentary formations exposed along the coast and within the Cordillera Occidental near Casma, Peru.

== Description ==
The sediments of the Casma Group reflect deposition in two distinct environments of the West Peruvian Basin. Some sediments were deposited near the Casma Volcanic Arc in an intra-cratonic sedimentary basin that was occasionally connected to the ocean. Other sediments were deposited in what was once a continental platform bounded by reefs and with anoxic pockets.

Together with the Morro Solar and Imperial Groups, the Casma Group contains clastic volcanosedimentary material derivative of the Mesozoic Casma Volcanic Arc. The folding of the Casma Group sediments is the result of the Cretaceous Mochica Phase of the Andean orogeny. The group is intruded by plutons of the Coastal Batholith of Peru.

The Casma Group include the following lithologies: gypsum, limestone, marl, tuff, lava flows, sandstone and conglomerate.
