= River rejuvenation =

Erosion process in geomorphology

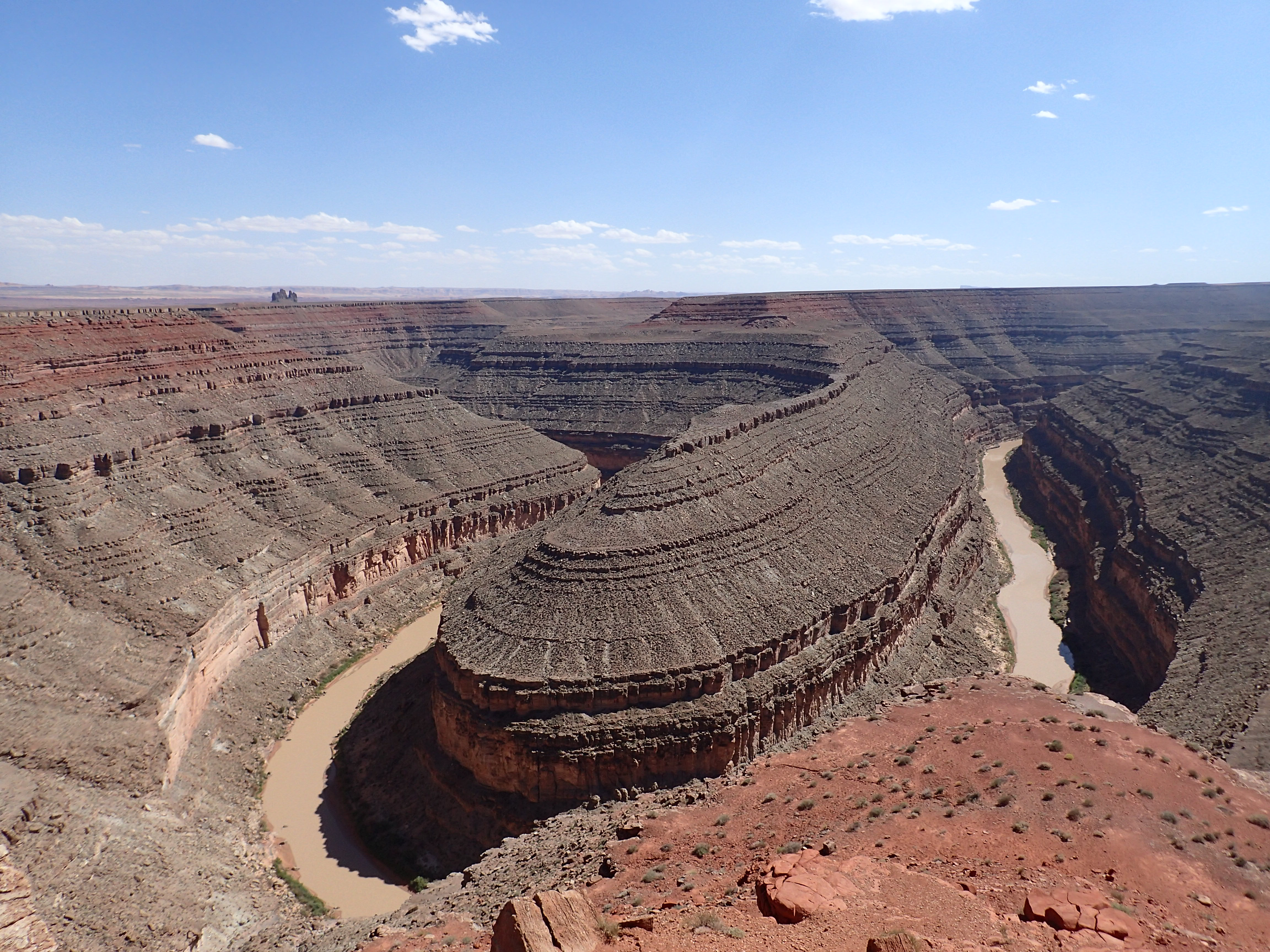
Terraced landscape, Goosenecks State Park, revealing the drop in river base level over time

In geomorphology, a river is said to be rejuvenated when it is eroding the landscape in response to a lowering of its base level. River rejuvenation refers to the renewed erosive activity of a river and can increase as a rivers flow increases. The process is often a result of a sudden fall in sea level or the rise of land. The disturbance enables a rise in the river's gravitational potential energy change per unit distance, increasing its riverbed erosion rate. The erosion occurs as a result of the river adjusting to its new base level.

== Signs ==
River rejuvenation can lead to a number of changes in the landscape. These include the formation of waterfalls and rapids, knick points, river terraces and incised meanders. Rejuvenated terrains usually have complex landscapes because remnants of older landforms are locally preserved. Parts of floodplains may be preserved as terraces alongside the down-cutting stream channels. Meandering streams are sweeping bends in rivers and can become entrenched, so a product of older river systems is found with steep, very pronounced V-shaped valleys - often seen with younger systems. When rejuvenation occurs on meanders vertical erosions begins to dominate over the lateral erosions that would normally occur.

== Example ==
One ancient example of rejuvenation is the Nile, which was rejuvenated when the Mediterranean Sea dried up in the late Miocene. The Nile River Valley conceals a massive canyon that was once the size of the Grand Canyon in Arizona. Geologists contribute the conformation of the canyon to the drying up of the Mediterranean Sea, this event was called the Messinian Salinity Crises. Its base level dropped from sea level to over two miles below sea level. It cut its bed down to several hundred feet below sea level at Aswan and 8000 feet below sea level at Cairo. After the Mediterranean re-flooded, those gorges gradually filled with silt.

== Causes of rejuvenation ==
Rejuvenation may result from causes which are dynamic, eustatic or isostatic in nature. All of these cause the river to erode its bed vertically (downcutting) faster as it gains gravitational potential energy. That causes effects such as incised meanders, steps where the river suddenly starts flowing faster, and fluvial terraces derived from old floodplains.

=== Dynamic rejuvenation ===
A region can be uplifted at any stage. This lowers the base level and streams begin active downward erosion again.

Dynamic rejuvenation may be caused by the epeirogenic uplift of a land mass. Warping or faulting of a drainage basin will steepen the stream gradient followed by the downcutting. The effect of seaward tilting can be felt immediately only when the direction of that stream is parallel to the direction of tilting.

=== Eustatic rejuvenation ===
Eustatic rejuvenation results from worldwide decrease in sea level, and two types of such rejuvenation are recognized. Diastrophic eustasy is the change in sea level due to variation in capacity of ocean basins, whereas glacio-eustasy is the change in sea level due to withdrawal or return of water into the oceans, due to the accumulation or melting of successive ice sheets.

Eustatic rejuvenation relocates the mouth of the stream. Shifting of a stream toward a new lower base level will proceed up-valley. The result may be an interrupted profile with the point of intersection of the old and new base levels.

=== Static rejuvenation ===
Three changes may bring static rejuvenation, to the stream.

1. decrease in loads
2. increase in runoff because of increased rainfall
3. increase in stream volume through acquisition of new tributaries

Rejuvenation due to decrease in load took place during post glacial times along many valleys that formerly received large quantities of glacial outwash. With change to no glacial conditions stream load decreased and valley deepening ensued.

Rejuvenation may result in a "knickpoint", as it appears on a river profile, which often appears as a rapids or a waterfall. An example is Seljalandsfoss in southern Iceland, where isostatic (dynamic) uplift has occurred as a result of both construction and deglaciation.

Static rejuvenation may also occur, in rare instances, when a downstream knickpoint erodes its way upstream to a lake which establishes base level for its tributaries. When the knickpoint reaches the lake, the lake drains, and the base level of upstream waters lowers rapidly from that of the (now former or shrunk) lake to that of the river downstream of the knickpoint. At some point in the future, a quite dramatic example will appear when Niagara Falls cuts its way back to Lake Erie.

== Canyons and gorges ==
Canyons and gorges are in the initial phase of valley development and are considered some of the most interesting valley forms. These forms result from accelerated entrenchment caused by recent tectonic activity such as especially vertical uplift. The uplift creates high-standing plateaus and as a result, perpetuates the downward erosive power of existing rivers.

== Knickpoint and river terraces ==
A knickpoint is a point on the river's course where there is a change in the gradient of the river profile. An example of a visible knickpoint would be a waterfall. However, some knickpoints can be concealed in the landscape. It is important that while there are other contributing factors to such features in the landscape, rejuvenation is one of the major influences. As mentioned, when a river rejuvenates, it gains more energy and erodes vertically to meet its new base level.

A river terrace is the remains of an old floodplain at a higher elevation than the present one. It typically results from river rejuvenation with further rejuvenation able to form new terraces, resulting in a step like profile around a river.
