= Tectonic–climatic interaction =

Interrelationship between tectonic processes and the climate system

Tectonic–climatic interaction is the interrelationship between tectonic processes and the climate system. The tectonic processes in question include orogenesis, volcanism, and erosion, while relevant climatic processes include atmospheric circulation, orographic lift, monsoon circulation and the rain shadow effect. As the geological record of past climate changes over millions of years is sparse and poorly resolved, many questions remain unresolved regarding the nature of tectonic-climate interaction, although it is an area of active research by geologists and palaeoclimatologists.

== Orographic controls on climate ==
Depending on the vertical and horizontal magnitude of a mountain range, it has the potential to have strong effects on global and regional climate patterns and processes including: deflection of atmospheric circulation, creation of orographic lift, altering monsoon circulation, and causing the rain shadow effect.

Simple illustration of the rain shadow effect

One example of an elevated terrain and its effect on climate occurs in the Southeast Asian Himalayas, the world's highest mountain system. A range of this size has the ability to influence geographic temperature, precipitation, and wind. Theories suggest that the uplift of the Tibetan Plateau has resulted in stronger deflections of the atmospheric jet stream, a heavier monsoonal circulation, increased rainfall on the front slopes, greater rates of chemical weathering, and thus lower atmospheric CO_{2} concentrations. It is possible that the spatial magnitude of this range is so great that it creates a regional monsoon circulation in addition to disrupting hemispheric-scale atmospheric circulation.

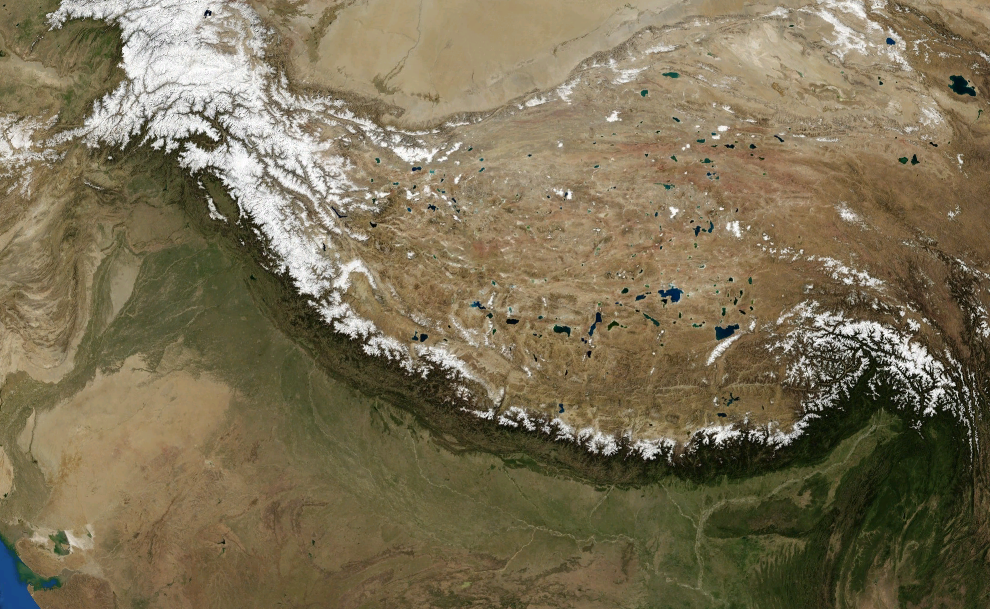
Example of the rain shadow effect in the Himalayas

The monsoon season in Southeast Asia occurs due to the Asian continent becoming warmer than the surrounding oceans during the summer; as a low-pressure cell is created above the continents, a high-pressure cell forms over the cooler ocean, causing advection of moist air, creating heavy precipitation from Africa to Southeast Asia. However, the intensity of the rainfall over Southeast Asia is greater than the African monsoon, which can be attributed to the awesome size of the Asian continent compared to the African continent and the presence of a vast mountain system. This not only affects the climate of Southeast Asia, but modifies the climate in neighboring areas such as Siberia, central Asia, the Middle East, and the Mediterranean basin as well. To test this a model was created that changed only the topography of current landmasses, which resulted in correlations between the model and global fluctuations in precipitation and temperature over the past 40 Myr. interpreted by scientists.

It is commonly agreed upon that global climate fluctuations are strongly dictated by the presence or absence of greenhouse gases in the atmosphere and carbon dioxide (CO_{2}) is typically considered the most significant greenhouse gas. Observations infer that large uplifts of mountain ranges globally result in higher chemical erosion rates, thus lowering the volume of CO_{2} in the atmosphere as well as causing global cooling. This occurs because in regions of higher elevation there are higher rates of mechanical erosion (i.e. gravity, fluvial processes) and there is constant exposure and availability of materials available for chemical weathering. The following is a simplified equation describing the consumption of CO_{2} during chemical weathering of silicates:

CaSiO_{3} + CO_{2} ↔ CaCO_{3} + SiO_{2}

From this equation, it is inferred that carbon dioxide is consumed during chemical weathering and thus lower concentrations of the gas will be present in the atmosphere as long as chemical weathering rates are high enough.

== Climate-driven tectonism ==
There are scientists who reject that uplift is the sole cause of climate change and are in favor of uplift as a result of climate change. Some geologists theorize that a cooler and stormier climate (such as glaciations and increased precipitation) can give a landscape a younger appearance such as incision of high terrains and increased erosion rates. Glaciers are a powerful eroding agent with the ability to incise and carve deep valleys and when rapid erosion of the earth's surface occurs, especially in an area of limited relief, it is possible for isostatic rebound to occur, creating high peaks and deep valleys. A lack of glaciation or precipitation can cause an increase in erosion, but can vary between localities. It is possible to create erosion in the absence of precipitation because there would be a decrease in vegetation, which typically acts as a protective cover for the bedrock.

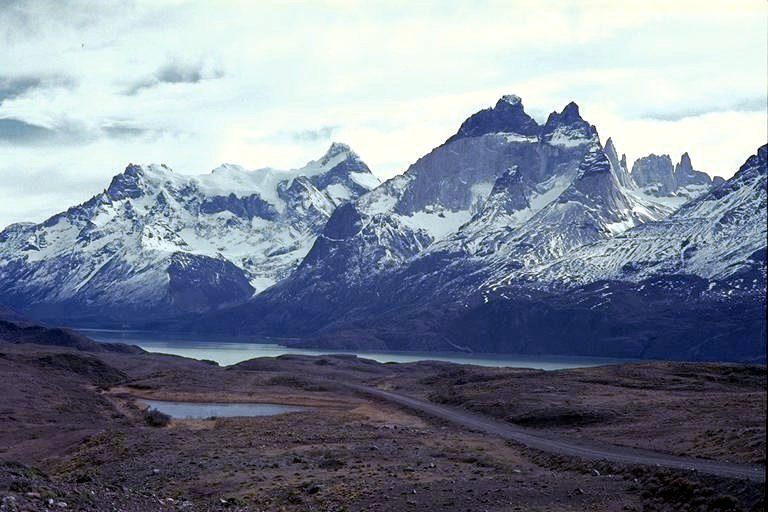
Peaks and valleys of the Torres del Paine range of the Andes in Chile

Models also suggest that certain topographic features of the Himalayan and Andes region are determined by an erosional/climatic interaction as opposed to tectonism. These models reveal a correlation between regional precipitation and a maximum topographic limit at the plateau margin. In the southern Andes where there is relatively low precipitation and denudation rates, there is no real extreme topography present at the plateau margin while in the north there are higher rates of precipitation and the presence of extreme topography.

Another interesting theory comes from an investigation of the uplift of the Andes during the Cenozoic. Some scientists hypothesize that the tectonic processes of plate subduction and mountain building are products of erosion and sedimentation. When there is an arid climate influenced by the rain shadow effect in a mountainous region, sediment supply to the trench can be reduced or even cut off. These sediments are thought to act as lubricants at the plate interface and this reduction increases the shear stress present at the interface that is large enough to support the high Andes.

== Volcanism ==
=== Introduction ===
Around the world, dotting the map are volcanoes of all shapes and sizes. Lining the landmass around the Pacific Ocean are the well-known volcanoes of the Pacific Ring of Fire. From the Aleutian Islands to the Andes Mountains in Chile, these volcanoes have sculpted their local and regional environments. Aside from admiring their majestic beauty, one might wonder how these geologic wonders work and what role they play in changing the landscape and atmosphere. Principally, volcanoes are geologic features that exude magmatic material from below Earth's surface onto the surface. Upon reaching the surface, the term "magma" disappears and "lava" becomes the common nomenclature. This lava cools and forms igneous rock. By examining igneous rocks, it is possible to derive a chain of events that led from the original melt of the magma to the crystallization of the lava at Earth's surface. By examining igneous rocks, it is possible to postulate evidence for volcanic outgassing, which is known to alter atmospheric chemistry. This alteration of atmospheric chemistry changes climate cycles both globally and locally.

=== Fundamentals of igneous rock and magmatic gas formation ===
Magmas are the starting point for the creation of a volcano. In order to understand volcanism, it is critical to understand the processes that form volcanoes. Magmas are created by keeping temperature, pressure, and composition (known as P-T-X) in the realm of melt conditions. The pressure and temperature for melts are understood by knowing the chemistry of the melt. To keep magma in a melt condition, a change in one variable will result in the change of another variable in order to maintain equilibrium (i.e. Le Chatlier's Principle). The production of magma is accomplished in multiple ways: 1) subduction of oceanic crust, 2) creation of a hot spot from a mantle plume, and 3) divergence of oceanic or continental plates. The subduction of oceanic crust produces a magmatic melt usually at great depth. Yellowstone National Park is a hot spot located within the center of a continent. Divergence of continental plates (i.e. the Atlantic Mid-Ocean ridge complex) creates magmas very near the surface of the Earth. A plume of heat from the mantle will melt rocks, creating a hot spot, which can be located at any depth in the crust. Hot spots in oceanic crust develop different magmatic plumbing systems based on plate velocities. Hawaii and the Madeira Archipelago (off the West coast of Africa) are examples of volcanic complexes with two different plumbing systems. Because islands such as Hawaii move more quickly than Madeira, the layered rocks at Hawaii have a different chemistry than those at Madeira. The layers beneath Hawaii and Madeira are different because the magma produced underground at these locations rests for different amounts of time. The longer the amount of time magma will rest underground, the warmer the host rocks become. Fractionation of crystals from melt is partially driven by heat; therefore, the igneous rock produced will vary from an insulated host to a non-insulated host. Each of these avenues of magmatic creation develops different igneous rocks and, thus, various P-T-X histories. Definitions and other geologic explanations of igneous systems are explained in Loren A. Raymond's Petrology text.

In order to understand the creation of igneous rocks from a melt, it is fundamental to understand the concepts produced by Drs. Norman Bowen and Frank Tuttle from the NaAlSiO_{4}-KAlSiO_{4}-SiO_{2}-H_{2}O system. Tuttle and Bowen accomplished their work by using experimental petrologic laboratories that produce synthetic igneous materials from mixes of reagents. Observations from these experiments indicate that as a melt cools, it will produce derivative magmas and igneous rock. Following Bowen's research, the magma will crystallize a mafic igneous rock prior to a felsic igneous rock. As this crystallization process occurs in nature, pressure and temperature decrease, which changes the composition of the melt along various stages of the process. This constantly changing chemical environment alters the final composition that reaches the Earth's surface.

The evolution of magmatic gases depends on the P-T-X history of the magma. These factors include the composition of assimilated materials and composition of parent rock. Gases develop in magma through two different processes: first and second boiling. First boiling is defined as a decrease in confining pressure below the vapor pressure of the melt. Second boiling is defined as an increase in vapor pressure due to crystallization of the melt. In both cases, gas bubbles exsolve in the melt and aid the ascent of the magma towards the surface. As the magma ascends towards the surface, the temperature and confining pressure decrease. A decrease in temperature and confining pressure will allow an increase in crystallization and vapor pressure of the dissolved gas. Depending on the composition of the melt, this ascent can be either slow or fast. Felsic magmas are very viscous and travel to the surface of the Earth slower than mafic melts whose silica levels are lower. The amount of gas available to be exsolved and the concentrations of gases in the melt also control ascension of the magma. If the melt contains enough dissolved gas, the rate of exsolution will determine the magmas rate of ascension. Mafic melts contain low levels of dissolved gases whereas felsic melts contain high levels of dissolved gases. The rate of eruption for volcanoes of different compositions is not the controlling factor of gas emission into the atmosphere. The amount of gas delivered by an eruption is controlled by the origin of the magma, the crustal path the magma travels through, and several factors dealing with P-T-x at the Earth's surface. When felsic melts reach the surface of the Earth, they are generally very explosive (i.e. Mount St. Helens). Mafic melts generally flow over the surface of the Earth and form layers (i.e. Columbia River Basalt). Magma development under continental crust develops a different type of volcano than magmas that are generated under oceanic crust. Subduction zones produce volcanic island arcs (such as the Aleutian Islands, Alaska) and non-arc volcanism (such as Chile and California). Typically, arc volcanism is more explosive than non-arc volcanism due to the concentrations and amounts of gasses withheld in the magma underground.

Fluid inclusion analysis from fluids trapped in minerals can show a path of volatile evolution in volcanic rocks. Isotopic analyses and interpretation of degassing scenarios are required in order to derive the origin of magmatic volatiles. When gas bubbles accumulate in a melt that is crystallizing, they create a vesicular texture. Vesicles are created by super cooling a melt while gases are present. Because the rock crystallized very quickly while in the Earth's atmosphere, it is possible to examine some igneous rocks for fluids trapped in vesicles. By examining many different inclusions, it is possible to detect crustal assimilation and depressurization that account for volatile release.

=== Methods of characterizing igneous rocks ===
The methods by which petrologists examine igneous rocks and synthetically produced materials are optical petrography, X-ray diffraction (XRD), electron probe microanalysis (EPMA), laser ablation inductively coupled mass spectrometry (LA-ICP-MS), and many others. Methods such as optical petrography aid the researcher in understanding various textures of igneous rocks and, also, the mineralogical composition of the rock. XRD methods define the mineralogical constituents of the rock being tested; therefore, composition is only known based on the mineralogical composition discovered using this method. EPMA reveals textural features of the rock on the micron level. It also reveals a composition of the rock based on elemental abundance. For information about fluids trapped in an igneous rock, LA-ICP-MS could be used. This is accomplished by finding rocks with small pockets of fluid or vapor, acquiring the fluid or vapor, and testing the fluid or vapor for various elements and isotopes.

=== Volcanic emissions and effects ===
While most volcanoes emit some mixture of the same few gasses, each volcano's emissions contain different ratios of those gasses. Water vapour (H_{2}O) is the predominant gas molecule produced, closely followed by carbon dioxide (CO_{2}) and sulfur dioxide (SO_{2}), all of which can function as greenhouse gasses. A few unique volcanoes release more unusual compounds. For example, mud volcanoes in Romania belch out much more methane gas than H_{2}O, CO_{2}, or SO_{2} −95–98% methane (CH_{4}), 1.5–2.3% CO_{2}, and trace amounts of hydrogen and helium gas. [13] To measure volcanic gases directly, scientists commonly use flasks and funnels to capture samples directly from volcanic vents or fumaroles. The advantage of direct measurement is the ability to evaluate trace levels in the gaseous composition. Volcanic gasses can be indirectly measured using Total Ozone Mapping Spectrometry (TOMS), a satellite-remote sensing tool which evaluates SO_{2} clouds in the atmosphere.[11][14] TOMS’ disadvantage is that its high detection limit can only measure large amounts of exuded gases, such as those emitted by an eruption with a Volcanic Explosivity Index (VEI) of 3, on a logarithmic scale of 0 to 7.

Sulfur ejection from volcanoes has a tremendous environmental impact, and is important to consider when studying the large-scale effects of volcanism. Volcanoes are the primary source of the sulfur (in the form of SO_{2}) that ends up in the stratosphere, where it then reacts with OH radicals to form sulfuric acid (H_{2}SO_{4}). When the sulfuric acid molecules either spontaneously nucleate or condense on existing aerosols, they can grow large enough to form nuclei for raindrops and precipitate as acid rain. Rain containing elevated concentrations of SO_{2} kills vegetation, which then reduces the ability of the area's biomass to absorb CO_{2} from the air. It also creates a reducing environment in streams, lakes, and groundwater. [15] Because of its high reactivity with other molecules, increased sulfur concentrations in the atmosphere can lead to ozone depletion and start a positive warming feedback.

Volcanoes with a felsic melt composition produce extremely explosive eruptions that can inject massive quantities of dust and aerosols high into the atmosphere. These particulate emissions are potent climate forcing agents, and can provoke a wide variety of responses including warming, cooling, and rainwater acidification. The climatic response depends on the altitude of the dust cloud as well as the size and composition of the dust. Some volcanic silicates cooled extremely quickly, created a glassy texture; their dark colour and reflective nature absorb some radiation and reflect the rest. Such volcanic material injected into the stratosphere blocks solar radiation, heating that layer of the atmosphere and cooling the area beneath it. Wind patterns can distribute the dust over vast geographic regions; for example, the 1815 eruption of Tambora in Indonesia produced so much dust that a cooling of 1 degree Celsius was noted as far away as New England, and lasted for several months. Europeans and Americans called its effect “the year without a summer”.

Volcanic emissions contain trace amounts of heavy metals, which can affect the hydrosphere when they are injected into the lower reaches of the atmosphere. When large quantities of these emissions are concentrated into a small area they can damage ecosystems, negatively affect agriculture, and pollute water sources. Materials being emitted from volcanoes typically carry heavy metals in the trace level. When large quantities of these emissions are collected into a small area, the contamination effects become paramount.

The short-term (months-to-years) impacts of volcanism on the atmosphere, climate and environment are strongly controlled by location, timing, flux, magnitude and emission height of sulfur gases. Episodic explosive eruptions represent the principal perturbation to stratospheric aerosol (though the atmospheric effects of sulfur degassing associated with continental flood basalts might well be more profound). In the troposphere, the picture is less clear but a significant part of the global tropospheric sulfate burden may be volcanogenic. Sulfate aerosol influences the Earth's radiation budget by scattering and absorption of shortwave and long-wave radiation, and by acting as cloud condensation nuclei. When they are brought to the boundary layer and Earth's surface, clouds containing volcanic sulfur in both gaseous and aerosol phases can result in profound environmental and health impacts.

Examples of the environmental and health impacts are agricultural loss due to acid rain and particulate shading, damage to ecosystems, and pollution in the hydrosphere. Intensity of a volcanic eruption is a variable controlling the altitude and effect of ejected material. Though larger eruptions occur less often than smaller eruptions, larger eruptions still deliver more particulate matter into the atmosphere. This year round behavior of emitted material yields mild effects on the atmosphere in comparison to larger eruptions. Over time, changes in the composition of smaller scale eruptions yields changes to atmospheric cycles and the global climate. Larger scale eruptions cause changes to the atmosphere immediately, which in turn leads to climatic changes in the immediate vicinity. The larger the volcanic expulsion, the higher the altitude achieved by the ejected silicate materials. Higher altitude injections are caused by larger intensity eruptions. Larger eruptions do not emit as much, on average, as smaller eruptions. This is related to the return period of the eruptions and the amount of ejected material per eruption. "The injection height of sulfur into the atmosphere represents another important determinant of climate impact. More intense eruptions, i.e., those with higher magma discharge rates, are more likely to loft the reactive sulfur gases into the stratosphere where they can generate climatically effective aerosol."

Eruption intensity of a volcano is not the only factor controlling the altitude of particles. The climate surrounding the volcano constrains the impact of the eruption. Models of eruptions that treat climatic variables as controls and hold eruption intensity constant predict particulate emissions, such as volcanic ash and other pyroclastic debris ejected into the atmosphere, in the tropics to reach higher altitudes than eruptions in arid or polar areas. Some of these climatic variables include humidity, aridity, winds, and atmospheric stability. The observation made by the model matches what is seen in nature: volcanoes in tropical climates have greater eruption heights than those in the poles. If there were a widening of the tropics, the number of volcanoes able to produce higher altitude emissions into the atmosphere would increase. Effects on the climate from the increase in airborne silicate material would be substantial because the height of these tropical eruptions will become more prominent with a widening of the tropics leading to more risks such as cooling, pollution, and aircraft disturbances.

The location of a volcano strongly influences the geographic distribution of atmospheric heating and the development of planetary waves that affect air circulation (especially in the northern hemisphere). Another relevant factor is that the height of the tropopause varies with latitude—at the tropics it is around 16–17 km above sea level but descends to 10–11 km at high latitudes. In general terms, an explosive eruption requires a greater intensity (magma discharge rate) to cross the tropopause in the tropics than at mid to polar latitudes. However, there are two factors that limit this effect. The first is that a high-latitude eruption will have a more limited effect than a low-latitude one because further from the tropics there is less solar energy to intercept. Secondly, atmospheric circulation works in a way to limit the effects of high latitude eruptions. A tropical eruption that pumps aerosol into the stratosphere results in localized heating. This increases the temperature difference in the middle atmosphere between the equator and high latitudes, and thereby enhances meridional air flows that spread aerosol into both hemispheres, promoting climate forcing at a worldwide scale. In contrast, volcanic aerosol injected into the stratosphere from high latitude volcanoes will tend to have the opposite effect on the temperature gradient, acting to stagnate meridional air flow. Very little, if any, of the stratospheric aerosol formed as a result of eruption of a high latitude volcano will reach the opposing hemisphere.

=== Interaction between glaciation and volcanoes ===
Volcanoes do not only affect the climate, they are affected by the climate. During times of glaciation, volcanic processes slow down. Glacial growth is promoted when summer heat is weak and winter cold is enhanced and when glaciers grow larger, they get heavier. This excess weight causes a reverse effect on the magma chamber's ability to produce a volcano. Thermodynamically, magma will dissolve gases more readily when the confining pressure on the magma is greater than the vapor pressure of the dissolved components. Glacial buildup typically occurs at high elevations, which are also the home to most continental volcanoes. Buildup of ice can cause a magma chamber to fail and crystallize underground. The cause of magma chamber failure occurs when the pressure of ice pressing down on Earth is greater than the pressure being exerted on the magma chamber from heat convection in the mantle. Ice core data from glaciers provides insight into past climate. "Oxygen isotopes and the calcium ion record are essential indicators of climatic variability, while peaks in sulfate ions (SO_{4}) and in electrical conductivity of the ice indicate volcanic aerosol fallout." As seen in ice cores, volcanic eruptions in the tropics and southern hemisphere are not recorded in the Greenland Ice sheets. Fallout from tropical eruptions can be seen at both poles though this takes nearly two years and consists of only sulfuric precipitation. "One of the striking revelations of the ice core record is the evidence for numerous great eruptions, which have not otherwise been recognized in tephra records. One caveat to the approach is that although the dating of the ice core by counting of seasonal layers is fairly robust, it is not fail-safe. The greater the depth from which the core is retrieved, the more likely it is to have suffered deformation Prevailing winds and atmospheric chemistry play a large role in moving volcanic volatiles from their source to their final locations at the surface or in the atmosphere."

=== Cretaceous climate ===
During the Cretaceous, Earth experienced an unusual warming trend. Two explanations for this warming are attributed to tectonic and magmatic forces. One of the theories is a magmatic super plume inducing a high level of CO_{2} into the atmosphere. Carbon dioxide levels in the Cretaceous could have been as high as 3.7 to 14.7 times their present amounts today causing an average 2.8 to 7.7 degrees Celsius. Tectonically, movements of the plates and a sea level fall could cause an additional 4.8 degrees Celsius globally. The combined effect between magmatic and tectonic processes could have placed the Cretaceous Earth 7.6 to 12.5 degrees Celsius higher than today.

A second theory on the warm Cretaceous is the subduction of carbonate materials. By subducting carboniferous materials, a release of carbon dioxide would emit from volcanoes. During the Cretaceous, the Tethys Sea was rich in limestone deposits. By subducting this carboniferous platform, the resulting magma would have become more carbon dioxide rich. Because carbon dioxide dissolves into melts well, it would have remained dissolved until the confining pressure of the magma was low enough to de-gas and release massive quantities of carbon dioxide into the atmosphere causing warming.

=== Conclusion ===
Volcanoes represent powerful images and forces on Earth's landscape. Generation of a volcano depends on its location and magmatic origin. Magmas will remain a melt until pressure and temperature allow crystallization and outgassing. During outgassing, the magma chamber will rise and meet Earth's surface causing a volcano. Depending on the composition of the melted material, this volcano could contain a variety of gases. Most of the gases emitted via volcanic eruption are greenhouse gases and cause atmospheric alterations. These atmospheric alterations then force the climate, both regionally and locally, to reach a new equilibrium with the new atmosphere. These changes can reflect as cooling, warming, higher precipitation rates and many others.

== See also ==
- River terraces (tectonic–climatic interaction)
