= Coastal Batholith of Peru =

The Coastal Batholith of Peru (Spanish: Batolito costero peruano) is a group of hundreds, if not thousands, of individual plutons that crop out near or at the coast of Peru. The batholith runs a length of ca. 1600 km. Most of the plutons of the batholith were intruded in an elongated coast-parallel extensional basin. The magma that formed the batholith's plutons is thought to have originated from the partial melting of hydrated basaltic rocks at the base of the crust during rifting (extension). Subsequently, the rift basin was inverted. During the ascent the magma followed vertical pathways but emplacement was mostly in the form of tabular bodies.

Plutons of the batholith intrude both the deformed strata of Marañón fold and thrust belt and the Casma Group.

== See also ==
- Casma Group
- Cordillera Blanca Batholith
- Vicuña Mackenna Batholith
