= Sedimentary basin =

Regions of long-term subsidence creating space for infilling by sediments

Sedimentary basins are region-scale depressions of the Earth's crust where subsidence has occurred and a thick sequence of sediments have accumulated to form a large three-dimensional body of sedimentary rock. They form when long-term subsidence creates a regional depression that provides accommodation space for accumulation of sediments. Over millions or tens or hundreds of millions of years the deposition of sediment, primarily gravity-driven transportation of water-borne eroded material, acts to fill the depression. As the sediments are buried, they are subject to increasing pressure and begin the processes of compaction and lithification that transform them into sedimentary rock.

Simplified schematic diagrams of common tectonic environments where sedimentary basins are formed

Sedimentary basins are created by deformation of Earth's lithosphere in diverse geological settings, usually as a result of plate tectonic activity. Mechanisms of crustal deformation that lead to subsidence and sedimentary basin formation include the thinning of underlying crust; depression of the crust by sedimentary, tectonic or volcanic loading; or changes in the thickness or density of underlying or adjacent lithosphere. Once the process of basin formation has begun, the weight of the sediments being deposited in the basin adds a further load on the underlying crust that accentuates subsidence and thus amplifies basin development as a result of isostasy.

The long-term preserved geologic record of a sedimentary basin is a large-scale contiguous three-dimensional package of sedimentary rocks created during a particular period of geologic time, a 'stratigraphic succession', that geologists continue to refer to as a sedimentary basin even if it is no longer a bathymetric or topographic depression. The Williston Basin, Molasse basin and Magallanes Basin are examples of sedimentary basins that are no longer depressions. Basins formed in different tectonic regimes vary in their preservation potential. Intracratonic basins, which form on highly stable continental interiors, have a high probability of preservation. In contrast, sedimentary basins formed on oceanic crust are likely to be destroyed by subduction. Continental margins formed when new ocean basins like the Atlantic are created as continents rift apart are likely to have lifespans of hundreds of millions of years, but may be only partially preserved when those ocean basins close as continents collide.

Sedimentary basins are of great economic importance. Almost all the world's natural gas and petroleum and all of its coal are found in sedimentary rock. Many metal ores are found in sedimentary rocks formed in particular sedimentary environments. Sedimentary basins are also important from a purely scientific perspective because their sedimentary fill provides a record of Earth's history during the time in which the basin was actively receiving sediment.

More than six hundred sedimentary basins have been identified worldwide. They range in areal size from tens of square kilometers to well over a million, and their sedimentary fills range from one to almost twenty kilometers in thickness.

== Classification ==
A dozen or so common types of sedimentary basins are widely recognized and several classification schemes are proposed, however no single classification scheme is recognized as the standard.

Most sedimentary basin classification schemes are based on one or more of these interrelated criteria:

- Plate tectonic setting – the proximity to a divergent, convergent or transform plate tectonic boundary and the type and origin of the tectonically induced forces that cause a basin to form, specifically those active at the time of active sedimentation in the basin.
- Nature of underlying crust – basins formed on continental crust are quite different from those formed on oceanic crust as the two types of lithosphere have very different mechanical characteristics (rheology) and different densities, which means they respond differently to isostasy.
- Geodynamics of basin formation – the mechanical and thermal forces that cause lithosphere to subside to form a basin.
- Petroleum/economic potential – basin characteristics that influence the likelihood for the basin to have an accumulations of petroleum or the manner in which it formed.

== Widely recognized types ==
Although no one basin classification scheme has been widely adopted, several common types of sedimentary basins are widely accepted and well understood as distinct types. Over its complete lifespan a single sedimentary basin can go through multiple phases and evolve from one of these types to another, such as a rift process going to completion to form a passive margin. In this case the sedimentary rocks of the rift basin phase are overlain by those rocks deposited during the passive margin phase. Hybrid basins where a single regional basin results from the processes that are characteristic of multiple of these types are also possible.

Widely recognized types of sedimentary basins
Sedimentary basin type	Associated type of plate boundary	Description and formation	Modern, active examples	Ancient (no longer active) examples
Rift basin	Divergent	Rift basins are elongate sedimentary basins formed in depressions created by tectonically induced thinning (stretching) of continental crust, generally bounded by normal faults that create grabens and half-grabens. Some authors recognize two subtypes: Terrestrial Rift Valleys – largely subaerial valleys that are rifts in continental crust commonly with bimodal volcanism; Proto-oceanic Rift Troughs – incipient ocean basins where new oceanic crust is forming, flanked on either side by young rifted continental margins; Typical rift formation in cross-section	Terrestrial rift valleys: Rio Grande Rift; Upper Rhine Plain; East African Rift; Proto-oceanic rift troughs: Gulf of Suez Rift; Gulf of California	Newark Basin; Fundy Basin; Midcontinent Rift System; West Antarctic Rift System; Oslo Graben; Reelfoot Rift
Passive margin	Divergent	Passive margins generally have deep sedimentary basins that form along the margin of a continent after two continents have completely rifted apart to become separated by an ocean. Cooling and densification of the underlying lithosphere over tens of millions of years drives subsidence that allows thick accumulations of sediments eroded from the adjacent continent. Some authors distinguish two subtypes based on volcanism during the early phases of margin development, non-volcanic passive margins and volcanic passive margins. Typical passive margin cross-section Passive margins are long-lived and generally become inactive only as a result of the closing of a major ocean through continental collision resulting from plate tectonics. As a result the sedimentary record of inactive passive margins often are found as thick sedimentary sequences in mountain belts. For example the passive margins of the ancient Tethys Ocean are found in the mountain belts of the Alps and Himalayas that formed when the Tethys closed.	Global distribution of passive margins	Tethys sedimentary sequence of the Tethys Himalaya (Tibet, Nepal); Late Jurassic and Triassic sedimentary sequence of the Southern Alps (northern Italy); Paleozoic sedimentary sequence of the southern Canadian Rocky Mountains; Paleozoic sedimentary rocks of the Grand Canyon
Foreland Basin	Convergent	An elongate basin that develops adjacent and parallel to an actively growing mountain belt when the immense weight created by the growing mountains on top of continental lithosphere causes the plate to bend downward. Many authors recognize two subtypes of foreland basins: Peripheral foreland basins - where the topographic load of a large mountain belt being formed and thrust onto a plate, usually as a result of orogenesis due to continental collision, causes continental lithosphere to bend downward along the mountain front.; Retroarc foreland basins - which form behind (landward from) an active volcanic arc associated with a convergent plate boundary; Peripheral vs. Retroarc foreland basins	Peripheral foreland basins: Molasse basin; Western Canadian Sedimentary Basin; Himalayan foreland basin; Persian Gulf; Junggar Basin; Retroarc foreland basins: Andean foreland basins	Junggar Basin; Alaska North Slope basin; Western Interior Seaway; Windermere Supergroup; Appalachian Basin; Sydney Basin
Back-arc basin	Convergent	Back-arc basins result from stretching and thinning of crust behind volcanic arcs resulting when tensional forces created at the plate boundary pull the overriding plate toward the subducting oceanic plate in a process known as oceanic trench rollback. This only occurs when the subducting oceanic crust is older (>55 million years old), and therefore colder and denser, and being subducted at an angle greater than 30 degrees. Schematic cross-section of a typical convergent plate boundary showing formation of back-arc and forearc basins	Sea of Japan; Tyrrhenian Sea; North Fiji Basin; Lau Basin	Pannonian Basin; Rhenohercynian Zone
Forearc basin	Convergent	A sedimentary basin formed in association with a convergent plate tectonic boundary in the gap between an active volcanic arc and the associated trench, thus above the subducting oceanic plate. The formation of a forearc basin is often created by the vertical growth of an accretionary wedge that acts as a linear dam, parallel to the volcanic arc, creating a depression in which sediments can accumulate. Schematic diagram of the California continental margin during the Cretaceous, showing the deposition of the Great Valley Sequence in a forearc basin between the Franciscan accretionary wedge and the volcanic arc of the Sierra Nevada	Mentawai Strait (aka Bengkulu-Mantawai forearc basin); Magdalena Shelf; Nias Basin; Strait of Georgia	Great Valley Sequence
Oceanic trench	Convergent	Trench basins are deep linear depressions formed where a subducting oceanic plate descends into the mantle, beneath the overriding continental (Andean type) or oceanic plate (Mariana type). Trenches form in the deep ocean but, particularly where the overriding plate is continental crust they can accumulate thick sequences of sediments from eroding coastal mountains. Smaller 'trench slope basins' can form in association with a trench can form directly atop the associated accretionary prism as it grows and changes shape creating ponded basins. Trench fill sedimentary basin in the context of a convergent plate boundary	Middle America Trench; Western edge of Vancouver Island; Aleutian Trench; Japan Trench; Sunda Trench; Peru–Chile Trench	Farallon Trench; Tethyan Trench
Pull-apart basin	Transform	Schematic diagram of the formation of a pull-apart basin Pull-apart basins is are created along major strike-slip faults where a bend in the fault geometry or the splitting of the fault into two or more faults creates tensional forces that cause crustal thinning or stretching due to extension, creating a regional depression. Frequently, the basins are rhombic, S-like or Z-like in shape.	Dead Sea; Los Angeles Basin; Cayman Trough; Salton Trough	Gramscatho Basin; Ridge Basin
Cratonic basin (Intracratonic basin)	None	A broad comparatively shallow basin formed far from the edge of a continental craton as a result of prolonged, broadly distributed but slow subsidence of the continental lithosphere relative to the surrounding area. They are sometimes referred to as intracratonic sag basins. They tend to be subcircular in shape and are commonly filled with shallow water marine or terrestrial sedimentary rocks that remain flat-lying and relatively undeformed over long periods of time due to the long-lived tectonic stability of the underlying craton. The geodynamic forces that create them remain poorly understood.	Barents Sea; Chad Basin	Michigan Basin; Williston Basin; Hudson Bay Basin; Uinta Mountain Group; Amadeus Basin; Paraná Basin

== Mechanics of formation ==
Sedimentary basins form as a result of regional subsidence of the lithosphere, mostly as a result of a few geodynamic processes.

=== Lithospheric stretching ===
Illustration of lithospheric stretching

If the lithosphere is caused to stretch horizontally, by mechanisms such as rifting (which is associated with divergent plate boundaries) or ridge-push or trench-pull (associated with convergent boundaries), the effect is believed to be twofold. The lower, hotter part of the lithosphere will "flow" slowly away from the main area being stretched, whilst the upper, cooler and more brittle crust will tend to fault (crack) and fracture. The combined effect of these two mechanisms is for Earth's surface in the area of extension to subside, creating a geographical depression which is then often infilled with water and/or sediments. (An analogy is a piece of rubber, which thins in the middle when stretched.)

An example of a basin caused by lithospheric stretching is the North Sea – also an important location for significant hydrocarbon reserves. Another such feature is the Basin and Range Province which covers most of Nevada, forming a series of horst and graben structures.

Tectonic extension at divergent boundaries where continental rifting is occurring can create a nascent ocean basin leading to either an ocean or the failure of the rift zone. Another expression of lithospheric stretching results in the formation of ocean basins with central ridges. The Red Sea is in fact an incipient ocean, in a plate tectonic context. The mouth of the Red Sea is also a tectonic triple junction where the Indian Ocean Ridge, Red Sea Rift and East African Rift meet. This is the only place on the planet where such a triple junction in oceanic crust is exposed subaerially. This is due to a high thermal buoyancy (thermal subsidence) of the junction, and also to a local crumpled zone of seafloor crust acting as a dam against the Red Sea.

=== Lithospheric flexure ===
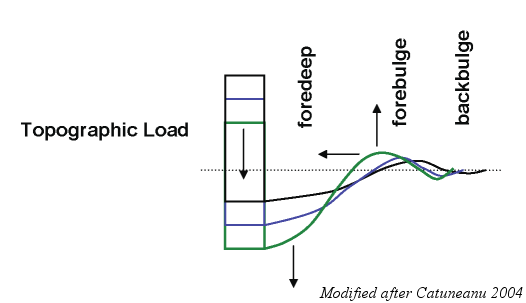
Schematic illustration of viscoelastic lithospheric flexure

Lithospheric flexure is another geodynamic mechanism that can cause regional subsidence resulting in the creation of a sedimentary basin. If a load is placed on the lithosphere, it will tend to flex in the manner of an elastic plate. The magnitude of the lithospheric flexure is a function of the imposed load and the flexural rigidity of the lithosphere, and the wavelength of flexure is a function of flexural rigidity of the lithospheric plate. Flexural rigidity is in itself, a function of the lithospheric mineral composition, thermal regime, and effective elastic thickness of the lithosphere.

Plate tectonic processes that can create sufficient loads on the lithosphere to induce basin-forming processes include:

- formation of new mountain belts through orogeny create massive regional topographic highs that impose loads on the lithosphere and can result in foreland basins.
- growth of a volcanic arc as the result of subduction or even the formation of a hotspot volcanic chain.
- growth of an accretionary wedge and thrusting of it onto the overriding tectonic plate can contribute to the formation of forearc basins.

After any kind of sedimentary basin has begun to form, the load created by the water and sediments filling the basin creates additional load, thus causing additional lithospheric flexure and amplifying the original subsidence that created the basin, regardless of the original cause of basin inception.

=== Thermal subsidence ===
Cooling of a lithospheric plate, particularly young oceanic crust or recently stretched continental crust, causes thermal subsidence. As the plate cools it shrinks and becomes denser through thermal contraction. Analogous to a solid floating in a liquid, as the lithospheric plate gets denser it sinks because it displaces more of the underlying mantle through an equilibrium process known as isostasy.

Thermal subsidence is particularly measurable and observable with oceanic crust, as there is a well-established correlation between the age of the underlying crust and depth of the ocean. As newly formed oceanic crust cools over a period of tens of millions of years. This is an important contribution to subsidence in rift basins, backarc basins and passive margins where they are underlain by newly formed oceanic crust.

=== Strike-slip deformation ===
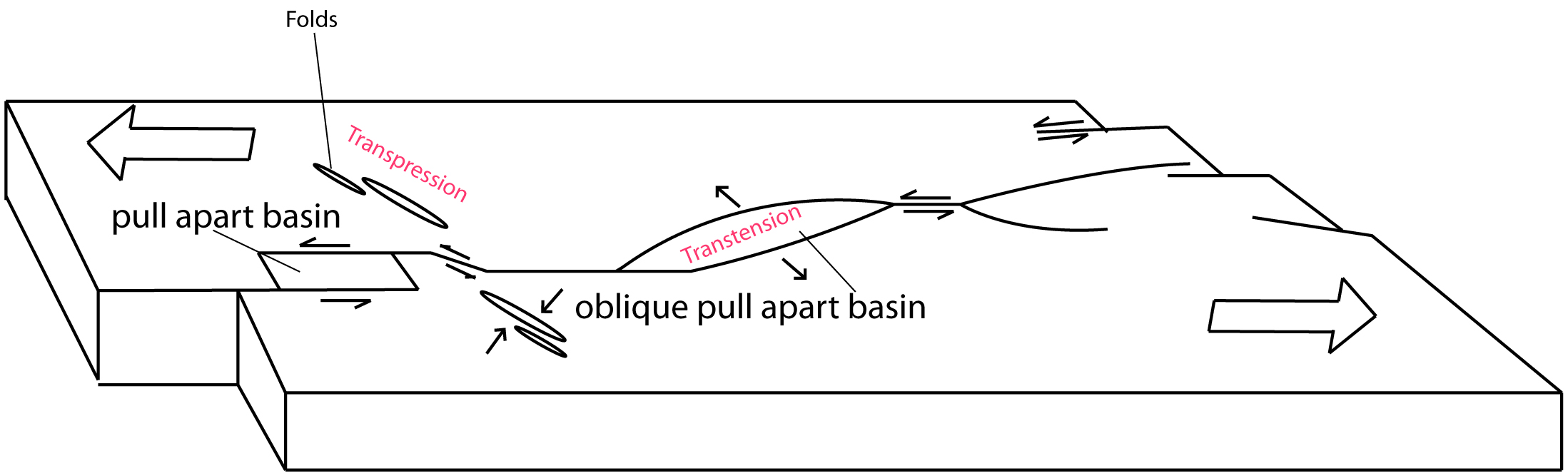
Shematic diagram of a strike-slip tectonic setting with fault bends creating areas of transtension and transpression

In strike-slip tectonic settings, deformation of the lithosphere occurs primarily in the plane of Earth as a result of near horizontal maximum and minimum principal stresses. Faults associated with these plate boundaries are primarily vertical. Wherever these vertical fault planes encounter bends, movement along the fault can create local areas of compression or tension.

When the curve in the fault plane moves apart, a region of transtension occurs and sometimes is large enough and long-lived enough to create a sedimentary basin often called a pull-apart basin or strike-slip basin. These basins are often roughly rhombohedral in shape and may be called a rhombochasm. A classic rhombochasm is illustrated by the Dead Sea rift, where northward movement of the Arabian Plate relative to the Anatolian Plate has created a strike slip basin.

The opposite effect is that of transpression, where converging movement of a curved fault plane causes collision of the opposing sides of the fault. An example is the San Bernardino Mountains north of Los Angeles, which result from convergence along a curve in the San Andreas Fault system. The Northridge earthquake was caused by vertical movement along local thrust and reverse faults "bunching up" against the bend in the otherwise strike-slip fault environment.

== Study ==
The study of sedimentary basins as entities unto themselves is often referred to as sedimentary basin analysis. Study involving quantitative modeling of the dynamic geologic processes by which they evolved is called basin modelling.

The sedimentary rocks comprising the fill of sedimentary basins hold the most complete historical record of the evolution of the earth's surface over time. Regional study of these rocks can be used as the primary record for different kinds of scientific investigation aimed at understanding and reconstructing the earth's past plate tectonics (paleotectonics), geography (paleogeography, climate (paleoclimatology), oceans (paleoceanography), habitats (paleoecology and paleobiogeography). Sedimentary basin analysis is thus an important area of study for purely scientific and academic reasons. There are however important economic incentives as well for understanding the processes of sedimentary basin formation and evolution because almost all of the world's fossil fuel reserves were formed in sedimentary basins.

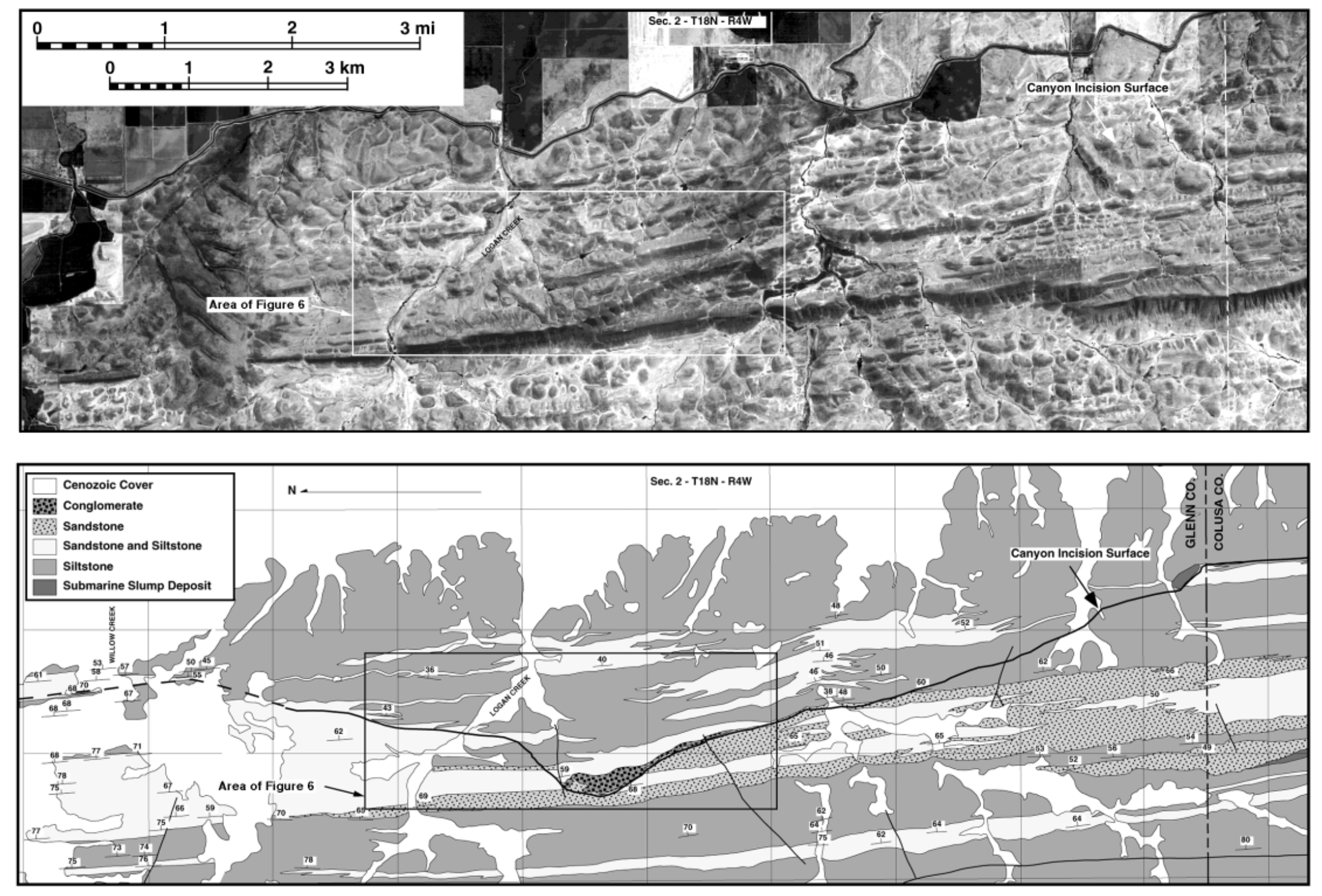
Example of surface geologic study of a sedimentary basin fill through field geologic mapping and interpretation of aerial photography. This example includes major erosional surface (sequence boundary) resulting from erosion and fill of a large submarine canyon.

All of these perspectives on the history of a particular region are based on the study of a large three-dimensional body of sedimentary rocks that resulted from the fill of one or more sedimentary basins over time. The scientific studies of stratigraphy and in recent decades sequence stratigraphy are focused on understanding the three-dimensional architecture, packaging and layering of this body of sedimentary rocks as a record resulting from sedimentary processes acting over time, influenced by global sea level change and regional plate tectonics.

=== Surface geologic study ===
Where the sedimentary rocks comprising a sedimentary basin's fill are exposed at the earth's surface, traditional field geology and aerial photography techniques as well as satellite imagery can be used in the study of sedimentary basins.

=== Subsurface geologic study ===
Much of a sedimentary basin's fill often remains buried below the surface, often submerged in the ocean, and thus cannot be studied directly. Acoustic imaging using seismic reflection acquired through seismic data acquisition and studied through the specific sub-discipline of seismic stratigraphy is the primary means of understanding the three-dimensional architecture of the basin's fill through remote sensing.

Direct sampling of the rocks themselves is accomplished via the drilling of boreholes and the retrieval of rock samples in the form of both core samples and drill cuttings. These allow geologists to study small samples of the rocks directly and also very importantly allow paleontologists to study the microfossils they contain (micropaleontology).

At the time they are being drilled, boreholes are also surveyed by pulling electronic instruments along the length of the borehole in a process known as well logging. Well logging, which is sometimes appropriately called borehole geophysics, uses electromagnetic and radioactive properties of the rocks surrounding the borehole, as well as their interaction with the fluids used in the process of drilling the borehole, to create a continuous record of the rocks along the length of the borehole, displayed as of a family of curves. Comparison of well log curves between multiple boreholes can be used to understand the stratigraphy of a sedimentary basin, particularly if used in conjunction with seismic stratigraphy.

== See also ==
- Structural basin – Large-scale structural geological depression formed by tectonic warping
- Drainage basin – Land area where water converges to a common outlet
- Endorheic basin – Closed drainage basin that has no outflow
- Plate tectonics – Movement of Earth's lithosphere
- Isostasy – State of gravitational equilibrium between Earth's crust and mantle
