= Continental margin =

Zone of the ocean floor

Profile illustrating the shelf, slope and rise

A continental margin is the outer edge of continental crust abutting oceanic crust under coastal waters. The continental margin consists of three different features: the continental rise, the continental slope, and the continental shelf. It is one of the three major zones of the ocean floor, the other two being deep-ocean basins and mid-ocean ridges. Continental margins constitute about 28% of the oceanic area.

== Subzones ==
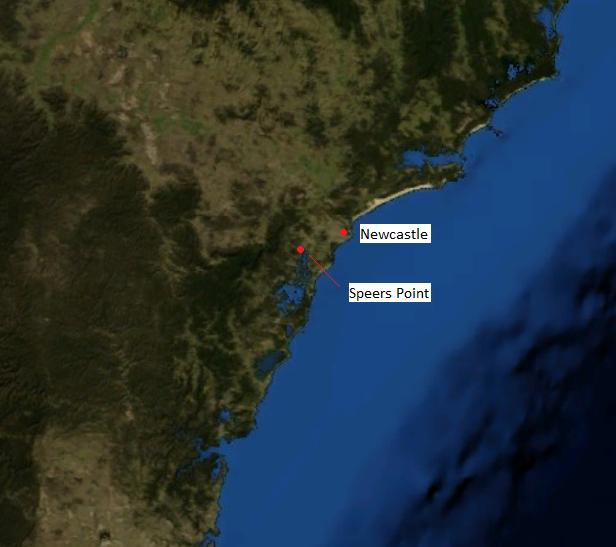
The continental slope of Australia, which is proximate to the coasts of Newcastle and Sydney (bottom left)

The continental shelf is the relatively shallow water area found in proximity to continents; it is the portion of the continental margin that transitions from the shore out towards the ocean. Continental shelves are believed to make up 7% of the sea floor. The width of continental shelves worldwide varies in the range of 0.03–1500 km. The continental shelf is generally flat, and ends at the shelf break, where there is a drastic increase in slope angle: The mean angle of continental shelves worldwide is 0° 07′, and typically steeper closer to the coastline than it is near the shelf break.

At the shelf break begins the continental slope, which can be 1–5 km above the deep-ocean floor. The continental slope often exhibits features called submarine canyons. Submarine canyons often cut into the continental shelves deeply, with near-vertical sides, and continue to cut the morphology to the abyssal plain.

These canyons are often V-shaped and can sometimes enlarge onto the continental shelf. At the base of the continental slope, there is a sudden decrease in slope angle, and the sea floor begins to level out towards the abyssal plain. This portion of the seafloor is called the continental rise, and marks the outermost zone of the continental margin.

== Types ==
There are two types of continental margins: active and passive margins.

Active margins are typically associated with lithospheric plate boundaries. These active margins can be convergent or transform margins, and are also places of high tectonic activity, including volcanoes and earthquakes. The West Coast of North America and South America are active margins. Active continental margins are typically narrow from coast to shelf break, with steep descents into trenches. Convergent active margins occur where oceanic plates meet continental plates. The denser oceanic crust of one plate subducts below the less dense continental crust of another plate. Convergent active margins are the most common type of active margin. Transform active margins are rarer and occur when an oceanic plate and a continental plate are moving parallel to each other in opposite directions. These transform margins are often characterized by many offshore faults, which causes a high degree of relief offshore, marked by islands, shallow banks, and deep basins. This is known as the continental borderland.

Passive margins are often located in the interior of lithospheric plates, away from the plate boundaries, and lack major tectonic activity. They often face mid-ocean ridges. From this comes a wide variety of features, such as low-relief land extending miles away from the beach, long river systems, and piles of sediment accumulating on the continental shelf. The East Coast of the United States is an example of a passive margin. These margins are much wider and less steep than active margins.

== Sediment accumulation ==
As continental crust weathers and erodes, it degrades into mainly sands and clays. Many of these particles end up in streams and rivers that then dump into the ocean. Of all the sediment in the stream load, 80% is then trapped and dispersed on continental margins. While modern river sediment is often still preserved closer to shore, continental shelves show high levels of glacial and relict sediments, deposited when sea level was lower. Often found on passive margins are several kilometres of sediment, consisting of terrigenous and carbonate (biogenous) deposits. These sediment reservoirs are often useful in the study of paleoceanography and the original formation of ocean basins. These deposits are often not well preserved on active margin shelves due to tectonic activity.

== Economic significance ==
The continental shelf is the most economically valuable part of the ocean. It often is the most productive portion of the continental margin, as well as the most studied portion, due to its relatively shallow, accessible depths.

Due to the rise of offshore drilling, mining, and the limitations of fisheries off the continental shelf, the United Nations Convention on the Law of the Sea (UNCLOS) was established. The edge of the continental margin is one criterion for the boundary of the internationally recognized claims to underwater resources by countries in the definition of the "continental shelf" by the UNCLOS (although in the UN definition the "legal continental shelf" may extend beyond the geomorphological continental shelf and vice versa). Such resources include fishing grounds, oil and gas accumulations, sand, gravel, and some heavy minerals in the shallower areas of the margin. Metallic mineral resources are thought to also be associated with certain active margins, and of great value.

== See also ==
- Continent-ocean boundary
- Convergent boundary
- Passive margin
