= Terrigenous sediment =

Sediments derived from the erosion of rocks on land

Terrigenous sediments are sediments derived from the chemical and physical weathering and erosion of continental rocks and consists primarily of mud, sand, and silt that is carried to the ocean by rivers. Their composition is mainly rock fragments and silicate minerals like quartz, feldspar, and clay minerals. Terrigenous sediments are mostly found closest to continents in coastal environments and continental shelves. Finer grained sediments like clay may be carried into deep-sea abyssal plains. They can accumulate in a wide variety of depositional environments, including fluvial, coastal, eolian, and in deep marine settings. This reflects diverse transport mechanisms such as rivers, wind, glaciers, and turbidity currents.

== Source and transport of terrigenous sediment ==
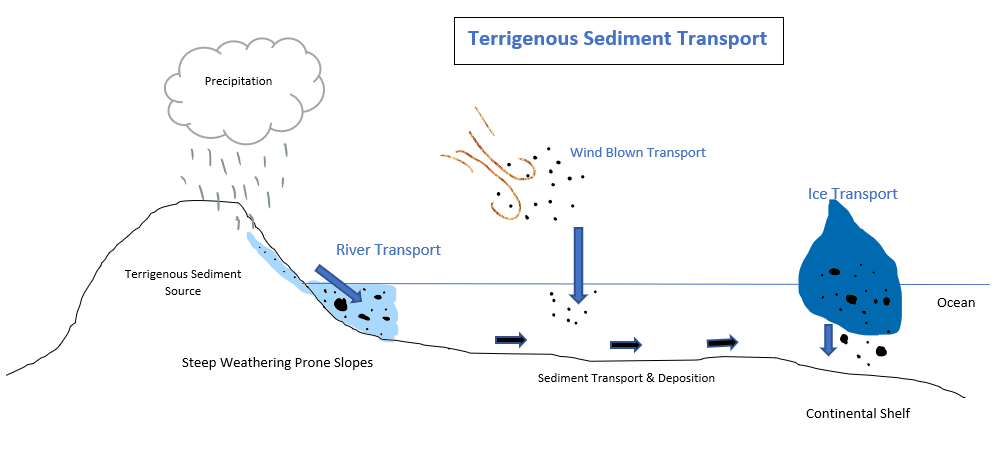
Simplified schematic diagram of transport of terrigenous sediment

Weathering of igneous rocks, sedimentary rocks, and metamorphic rocks may result in terrigenous sediment. Creation, transport, deposition and lithification of terrigenous sediment into sedimentary rocks make up an important part of the rock cycle. Weathering and erosion are two processes that generate terrigenous sediments. Rocks are weathered once they are exhumed Mechanisms of erosion and the transport of sediment are water, wind, glaciers, or gravity to the ocean or other localized depocenter.

=== Chemical weathering ===
Chemical weathering refers to the dissolution of rocks by weak acids present in water. Chemical weathering can alter land-derived sediment by transforming primary minerals into secondary minerals such as clays. One example of this process is the chemical weathering of K-feldspar into kaolinite. In general, incongruent dissolution is more common in nature and produces clays as a product of the dissolution. The chemical alteration in sediments can increase sediment maturity and release dissolved ions. Carbonic acid formed from the dissolution of carbon dioxide from the atmosphere into rainwater to produce carbonic acid. Precipitated carbonic acid enriched rainwater falls and runs over exposed silicate or carbonate minerals creating a fully dissolved fluvial load (congruent weathering) or partly dissolved load (incongruent weathering). It is also possible in some environments for the production of sulfuric acid as a result of the oxidation of sulfur minerals that leads to the weathering of carbonate minerals. Other organic acids are also capable of rock dissolution. Climatic changes (changes in long-term precipitation and temperature patterns) effect the rate of chemical weathering in a given region. Increased precipitation and increased temperature (through increased greenhouse gases or increased solar irradiance) yield higher rates of chemical weathering. Age functions as an inverse to chemical weathering rates, meaning that as soils and sediment get older, the rate of mineral dissolution decreases because of the decrease in reactive materials. Sediment grain surface area increase with decreasing grain size as unstable components of the grain are dissolved away. Weathering of terrigenous sediment supplies the salt ions that give the ocean its salinity. Accumulation of salt cation and anions accumulate in seawater, where their residence time can span hundreds of years to thousands of years.

=== Physical weathering ===
Physical weathering refers to the breakup of large rocks into smaller pieces. The physical rupture of parent rock material exposes new, unweathered rock to the atmosphere where it can begin to be weathered. Tectonics plays a critical role in uplifting new lithosphere to be exposed to weathering. Increased tectonic uplift functions as a direct relationship with chemical weathering rates, which results in increased terrigenous sediment production. There is also evidence that the climatic regime is important for determining chemical weathering rates.

Tectonic processes like continental collision, faulting, and crustal thickening can increase the production of land-derived sediments because these processes all push the crust upward and create orogens. Resulting high topography and steep slopes increase erosion and controls river gradients in mountainous regions. Tectonic activity that lead to the weathering of mountain belts mobilize sediment from land to different marine depositional environments. For example, erosion of sediments from the Himalayas feeds directly into the Bengal Fan. Without tectonics, continents would be low, erosion rates would drop, and terrigenous sediment supply to the oceans would decrease.

=== Determining sources and fate of solute and sediment transport ===
Sources of solutes and their behavior as a function of changing discharge produced from weathering for a catchment basin can be using power law relationship (assuming steady-state):

$C=a*R^b$

Where C is concentration of solute, a is catchment characteristic variable, R is runoff, which is discharge normalized to basin area, and b is the slope of the relationship between concentration and runoff. The slope or b-value can be interpreted as:

If b = 0, then the supply of sediment and transport exhibit chemostatic behavior

If b > 0, then the supply of sediment exceeds the transport capacity

If b < 0, then the transport capacity exceeds the supply of sediment

Total sediment flux to the ocean can be calculated by the following equation (assuming steady-state):

$Qs=\alpha R^{3/2} A^{1/2} e^{KT}$

Where Qs is total sediment flux, α and K are climate zone constants, R is relief relative to sea level, A is catchment area, and T is temperature.

== Depositional environments ==
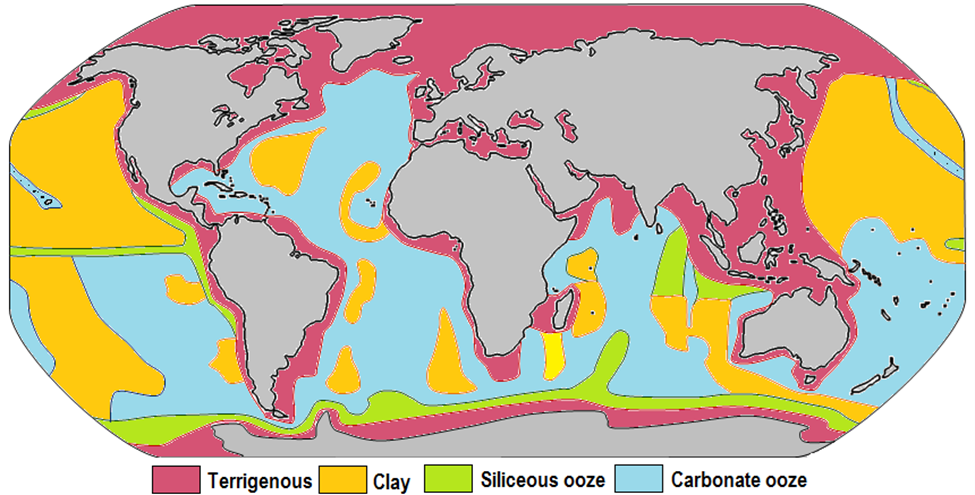
Global distribution of sediment on the seafloor

Terrigenous sediment mainly accumulates on continental shelves near continental masses. Large build up of terrigenous sediment form the continental shelves and beaches over millions of years of weathering and erosion. Terrigenous sediment found in the deep ocean are fine-grained clays, typically red clays rich in iron.

=== Turbidity currents ===
Simplified sediment density flow in Monterey Canyon

Terrigenous sediments on the continental shelf are subject to processes that are dominate in shallow marine environments like rivers, waves, and tidal currents. Turbidity currents are gravity-driven, underwater currents that rapidly move down slope and transport near-shore sediment deeper in the marine environment. They are one of the primary mechanisms of transport down the continental slope and into deep ocean basins. Turbidity currents enhance carbon burial efficiency by transporting sediment to deep-marine environments, which will reduce oxygen exposure and rapid sedimentation can increase long-term carbon preservation.

=== Eolian dunes ===
Eolian dunes are formed by sediments transported by wind. This is common in deserts and coastal areas because siliciclastic minerals erode, transport, and deposit sand to form dunes and other formations.

The siliciclastic minerals are transported through three methods called saltation, traction, and suspension. Saltation is the action of fine-grained material bouncing while being carried in turbulent air. Traction is the transport of larger grains rolling or sliding across a surface, usually results in saltation and erosion. Suspension is the process where wind lifts and carries these fine particles high into the atmosphere over vast distances.

Some common examples would be the Sahara Desert, Loess Plateau, and the Outer Banks. Many of these examples are created from different transport mechanisms. The dunes in the Saharan Deserts are often quartz-rich from weathered old rocks and recycling of older sediments.. The Loess Plateau is fine-grained silt that is transported by wind that forms thick blankets of sediment far from the original source. Lastly, the Outer Banks' sand originated from weathered material that is delivered by rivers to beaches and then reworked into the dunes.

=== Fluvial environments ===
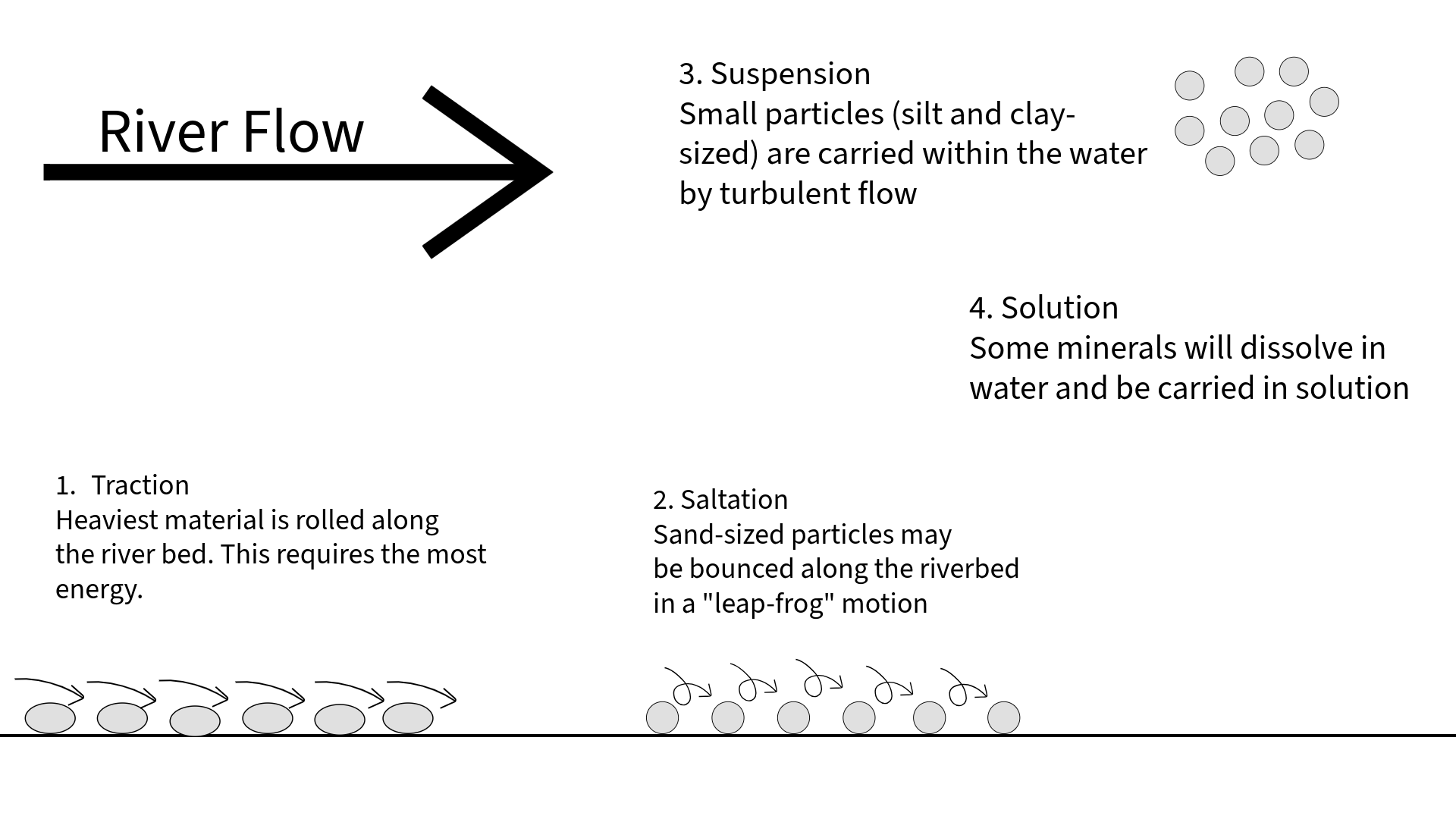
Potential mechanisms of transport of sediment during river flow

Fluvial environments are rivers and streams that can carry sediment from continents to oceans. This is a crucial link in source-to-sink sedimentary cycle. Rivers are high energy, turbulent flows that erode, transport, and deposit sediments based on flow velocity and grain size. Transport processes influence sediment characteristics such as grain size, sorting, and composition.

Sediment can be transported through two methods called bed load or bed material and suspended load or suspended sediment. Bed load carries the coarser, heavier sediment like gravel and sand by rolling, sliding, or saltating. Suspended load carries finer sediment like silt and clay through the water column shown in Figure 4.

== Methods of sediment source tracing ==
Sediment-tracing technology began in the early 1960s with research on sediment patterns, which include erosional and depositional rates and mass sediment accumulation. To determine the origin and transport routes of terrigenous sediments, scientists employ a variety of geochemical and biological techniques, such as radiogenic isotopes, grain size-analysis, biomarkers and compound specific stable isotopes, rare earth element (REE) patterns, paleomagnetism, fossil pollen, and radionuclides, among others. Often times, lacustrine (lake) systems are particularly valuable because they preserve continuous sediment records, unlike some marine records.

=== Radiogenic isotopes ===
Sediments created by weathering and erosion frequently preserve radiogenic isotopic signatures because rocks from various geographical locations and geological eras have unique isotope compositions. These isotopic compositions act as geochemical signatures that reflect their source regions based on local geology. By analyzing isotope ratios and comparing them with potential continental sources, scientists can determine the origin and transport pathways of sediments. Sediment tracing may use a combination of isotope tracers, such as strontium (Sr), neodymium (Nd), and lead (Pb). It is possible to determine the origin and mode of transportation of sediments by analyzing radiogenic isotope ratios in sediments and comparing them with possible source regions.

==== Strontium ====
One of the most widely utilized tracers in sediment origin research is the ratio of $\ce{^{87}_Sr}$ to $\ce{^{86}_Sr}$ ($\ce{^{87}_Sr}$/$\ce{^{86}_Sr}$). Sediments formed from rocks of various ages and compositions tend to retain these signatures during weathering and transportation because these rocks develop varied ratios of $\ce{^{87}_Sr}$ to $\ce{^{86}_Sr}$. Thus, measurements of strontium isotopes in natural waters and sediments enable researchers to track the flow of terriginous material from land to the ocean and determine the sources of sediment.

==== Neodymium ====
Neodymium (Nd) isotopes are also widely used in sediment tracing. The isotopic composition of neodymium is typically expressed using epsilon notation (εNd), which reflects deviations from a standard reference and varies depending on the geological characteristics of source regions.

Radiogenic Nd isotopes ($\ce{^{143}_Nd}$/$\ce{^{144}_Nd}$) are particularly useful because they retain the geochemical signature of their source rocks and are widely used to trace sediment provenance and mixing processes. Different geological regions exhibit distinct εNd values, allowing scientists to distinguish between sediment sources. Radiogenic Nd isotopes do not significantly fractionate during weathering and transport, making them reliable indicators of source rock composition. However, studies have shown that stable Nd isotopes may exhibit minor fractionation under certain weathering conditions, but it does not largely affect their use in analysis.

==== Lead ====
Lead (Pb) isotopes are used to trace both natural and anthropogenic sources of sediments. Variations in Pb isotope ratios arise from the radioactive decay of uranium and thorium in source rocks, producing distinct geochemical signatures. In addition to natural sources from rock weathering, lead isotopes can indicate anthropogenic disturbances such as industrial pollution, mining activity, and the historical use of leaded gasoline. These human-derived signatures allow researchers to detect contamination and environmental changes within sediment records.

Rare earth elements (REEs) are a group of chemically similar trace metals that include the lanthanides from lanthanum (La) to lutetium (Lu). Although they occur in low concentrations (nanogram per gram concentrations), their relative abundance patterns in sediments can reflect the composition of the original source rocks.

REEs are adsorbed onto clay minerals and other fine sediment particle surfaces during weathering and erosion. Their distribution patterns are frequently maintained because they are comparatively resistant to chemical change during transportation. Therefore, it is possible to identify sediment dispersal using differences in rare earth element patterns, such as the relative abundance of light vs. heavy REEs or anomalies in elements like cerium and europium.

=== Biomarkers ===
Biomarkers are organic molecules derived from specific biological sources that can be preserved in sediments over long periods of time. Some biomarkers originate from terrestrial plants, soils, or microbes, indicating that continental organic matter has been incorporated into marine or lacustrine sediments.

Terrigenous organic matter is frequently traced using substances like leaf wax lipids, lignin phenols, and other humic substances produced from plants. The presence of these molecules in marine or coastal sediments can reveal the contribution of terrestrial material carried by rivers, wind, or coastal processes since they are linked to certain biological sources. Specific biomarkers, such as lignin-derived compounds, are widely used indicators of terrestrial input because they are relatively resistant to degradation. Biomarkers can also provide insight to environmental conditions at the time of deposition. For example, carbon isotope variations can distinguish between different plant types and climate conditions. Biomarkers are often used alongside geochemical tracers to better understand the sources and transport pathways of terrigenous sediments.
