= Exhumed mantle =

Exhumed mantle is formed when Earth's mantle rocks are exhumed by extensional tectonics such that they appear at the seabed. This occurs in two main settings, either during seafloor spreading during the formation of oceanic core complexes, or during the rifting apart of continental crust during break-up on non-volcanic passive margins.

== Oceanic core complexes ==
Diagram of a megamullion of exhumed mantle

In normal rates of seafloor spreading, the space created by rifting along a mid-ocean ridge is filled by magma, forming the standard oceanic crust, with a central magma chamber, crystallising out as gabbros and ultramafic cumulates, feeding volcanic rocks (typically pillow lavas) via systems of dykes. Such oceanic crust matches layers 2 nd 3 of the classic ophiolite stratigraphy. Where spreading rates are intermediate or slow to ultraslow, magma does not necessarily reach the surface and extension involves detachment faulting in which mantle rocks in the fault footwall become exhumed at the seabed forming structures called "megamullions".

== Non-volcanic passive margins ==
Passive margins form during the break-up of existing continental masses as the product of progressive rifting. On some margins, there is very little magmatic activity during this process. On such non-volcanic passive margins, extension of the continental crust starts with fault block development within the upper part of the crust and ductile thinning within the lower crust and lithospheric mantle. As the extension continues, the lower parts of the thinning lithosphere cool and start to be included in the brittle faulting, initially in the lower crust and finally in the lithospheric mantle. The final result of this is exemplified in the West Iberian margin, where a combination of seismic reflection profiling and scientific drilling (ODP Legs 103, 149, and 173) have proved the presence of serpentinized continental mantle immediately below post-rift sedimentary rocks, confirming that the mantle was exhumed at the seafloor by the time continental break-up was complete.

== Recognition in orogenic belts ==
Ophiolites within the Alpine orogenic belt are dominantly serpentinized peridotites with very little evidence of pillow lavas and sheeted dykes and less gabbro than would be expected if they represented slices of normal oceanic crust. Locally extensional detachments are exposed that juxtapose continental crustal rocks against serpentinized peridotite, while elsewhere lower continental crust is seen to thin and eventually to be cut out by detachment faults, a section interpreted as a preserved ocean-continent transition.
