= Non-volcanic passive margins =

Non-volcanic passive margins (NVPM) constitute one end member of the transitional crustal types that lie beneath passive continental margins; the other end member being volcanic passive margins (VPM). Transitional crust welds continental crust to oceanic crust along the lines of continental break-up. Both VPM and NVPM form during rifting, when a continent rifts to form a new ocean basin. NVPM are different from VPM because of a lack of volcanism. Instead of intrusive magmatic structures, the transitional crust is composed of stretched continental crust and exhumed upper mantle. NVPM are typically submerged and buried beneath thick sediments, so they must be studied using geophysical techniques or drilling. NVPM have diagnostic seismic, gravity, and magnetic characteristics that can be used to distinguish them from VPM and for demarcating the transition between continental and oceanic crust.

== Typical characteristics ==
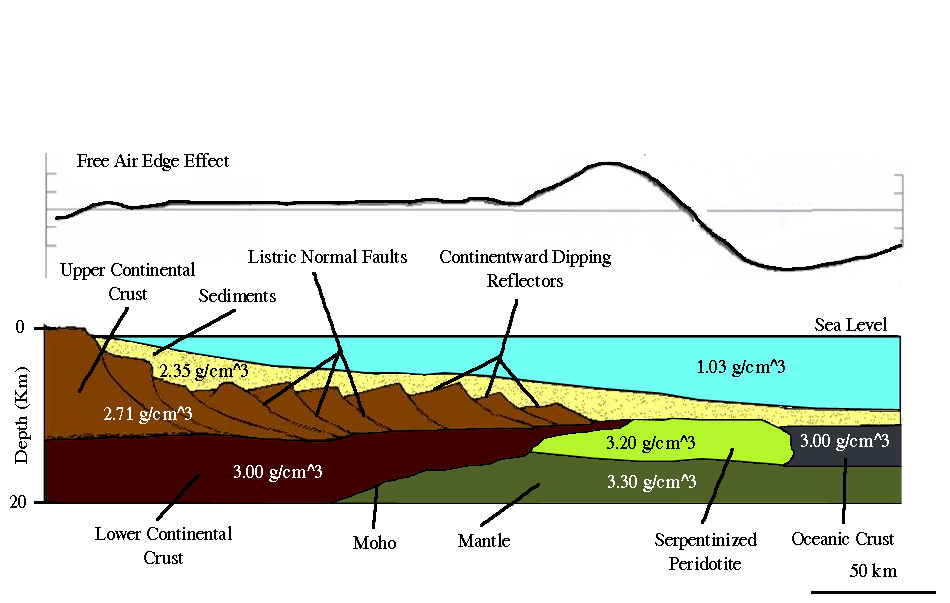

NVPM are the result of rifting when a continent breaks up to form an ocean, producing transitional crust without volcanism. Extension causes a number of events to occur. First is lithospheric thinning, which allows asthenospheric upwelling; heating further erodes the lithosphere, furthering the thinning process. The extensional forces also cause listric faults and continentward dipping reflectors that help identify NVPM and distinguish them from VPM, characterized by seaward-dipping seismic reflectors. The main difference between NVPM and VPM is that in the latter case, the mantle is hot enough to melt and produce voluminous basalts, whereas in the former case the mantle doesn't melt and there is little or no volcanism. Instead, extension simply pulls the crust away, exposing or "unroofing" the mantle, exposing serpentinized peridotite. The mantle doesn't melt because it is cold or upwells slowly, so there are no igneous rocks like there are in VPM. The basalts and granites are replaced with serpentinized peridotite, accompanied by unique serpentothermal and hydrothermal activity. Increasing density of the lithosphere as it cools and sediment accumulation causes subsidence.

== Geophysical properties ==
=== Seismic characteristics ===
Seismic reflection lines across passive margins show many structural features common to both VPM and NVPM, such as faulting and crustal thinning, with the primary contra-indicator for volcanism being the presence of continent-ward dipping reflectors.

NVPM also display distinct p-wave velocity structures that differentiate them from VPM. Typical NVPM exhibit a high velocity, high gradient lower crust (6.4-7.7 km/s) overlain by a thin, low velocity (4–5 km/s) upper crustal layer. The high velocity shallow layer is usually interpreted as the serpentinized peridotite associated with NVPM. In some cases, an extremely thick igneous underplating of a VPM will display similar P-wave velocity (7.2-7.8 km/s, but with a lower gradient). For this reason, velocity structure alone cannot be used to determine the nature of a margin.

=== Gravity properties ===
Gravity data provides information about the subsurface density distribution. The most important gravity feature associated with any continent-ocean transition, including NVPM, is the free-air edge effect anomaly, which consists of a gravity high and a gravity low associated with the contrast between the thick continental and thin oceanic crust. There are also subsurface variations in density that cause significant variations across the continent-ocean transition. The crust, as well as the entire lithosphere, is thinned due to mechanical extension. The Moho marks a large density contrast between crust and mantle, typically at least 0.35 g/cm3. The highest amplitudes of the gravity anomaly occur seaward of the continent-ocean transition. High-density upper mantle material is elevated relative to the more landward crustal root. The oceanic crust density is then further enhanced with gabbros and basalts and additionally contributes to the regional gravity trend.

Where the thickness of the crust and lithosphere varies, equilibrium must be reached. Isostatic compensation and gravity anomalies result from balance between mass excess of the extra mantle beneath the thinned lithosphere and the overlying low-density crust. Positive gravity anomalies result from the relatively low flexural strength of the lithosphere during the beginning of rifting. As the passive margin matures, the crust and uppermost mantle become colder and stronger, so that the compensating deflection in the base of the lithosphere is broader than the actual rift. Higher flexural strength results in a broadening of the gravity anomaly with time.

=== Magnetic properties ===
The magnetic signature of a passive continental margin is influenced by the volume of material with a high magnetic susceptibility and the depth of the material below the surface. Large amplitude magnetic anomalies are associated with high magnetic susceptibility (~0.06 emu) igneous rocks of VPM. In contrast, NVPM exhibit only small amplitude anomalies associated with the edge effect at the boundary between the exhumed mantle (~0.003 emu) at the transition zone, and the true oceanic crust basalt (~0.05 emu). This anomaly can be used to locate the boundary between transitional crust and oceanic crust. The absence of large amplitude anomalies is a very strong indication that a margin is non-volcanic.

== Formation ==
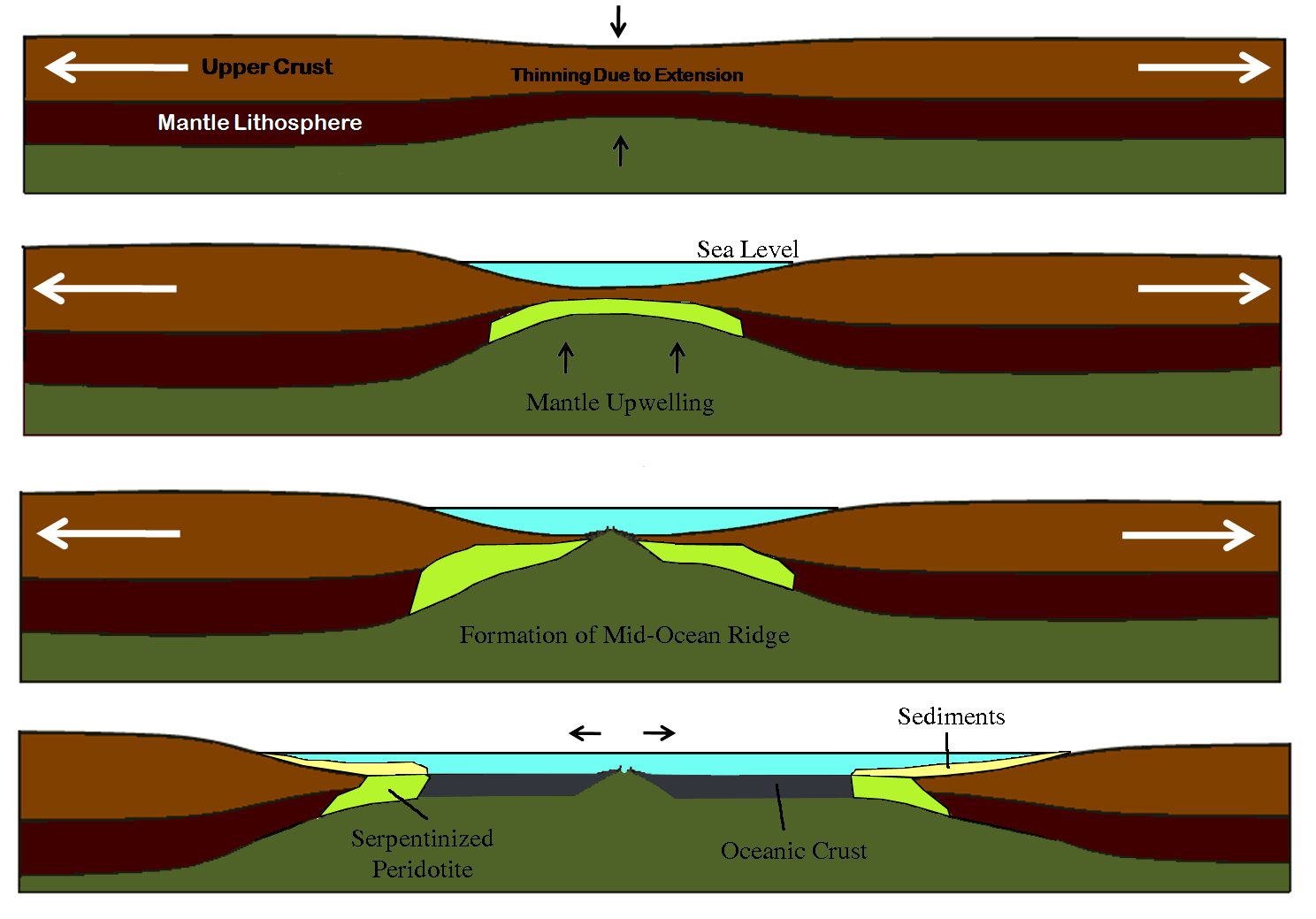

=== Passive rifting ===
Passive rifting, unlike active rifting, occurs principally by extensional tectonic forces as opposed to magmatic forces originating from convection cells or mantle plumes. Isostatic forces allow mantle material to rise under the thinning lithosphere. Subsidence and sedimentation occur during both the initial rifting stage and the post rifting stages. Only after initial rifting does any mantle melting occur. Continued extension of the lithosphere will eventually lead to decompression melting of the mantle and the formation of a mid-ocean ridge. This process results in the creation of an ocean basin, and possibly conjugate NVPM.

=== Rifting models ===
There are several models for forming NVPM. Passive rifting can follow McKenzie's pure shear model, Wernicke's simple shear model, or a composite model combining features of both, as observed at the Galicia bank NVPM.

==== McKenzie pure shear model ====
Pure shear describes “homogeneous flattening” of rocks without rotations, while maintaining a constant volume. If a cube undergoes pure shearing, the result will be a rectangular prism with sides parallel to those of the initial cube. McKenzie's model predicts symmetric structures on either side of the rift zone composed of rotated fault blocks bounded by normal faults.

==== Wernicke simple shear model ====
In contrast to pure shear, simple shear describes constant volume strain with rotations. If a cube undergoes simple shearing, the result will be a parallelogram with sides that increase in length and are no longer parallel to the sides of the original cube. The top and bottom of the cube will neither stretch nor shorten. In a simple shear model, a basin is stretched asymmetrically by a large scale detachment fault extending from the upper crust to the lower lithosphere and even asthenosphere.

== Galicia bank ==
=== Composite model formation ===
During the Late Jurassic-Early Cretaceous, tectonic extensional forces created a shallow angle east-dipping detachment fault. This fault cut from what is now the Flemish Cap margin in Nova Scotia, eastern Canada to the Galicia margin, which is located west of the Iberian Peninsula. This fault penetrated the upper portion of the continental crust and merged into the transition between brittle upper and plastic lower crust. In time, displacement along this detachment fault decreased to zero at a point under the Galicia margin. East of this detachment fault, the structure of the Galicia NVPM is entirely pure shear resulting in rotated fault blocks, normal faults, and continent-ward dipping seismic reflectors. Simple shear is only evident in the western edge of the Galicia margin and the upper crust of the Flemish Cap margin where the crust is brittle. Below this brittle crust, the ductile crust follows McKenzie's pure shear model. Mantle material composed of peridotites is serpentinized by circulating seawater after it rises close enough to the upper crust due to its low density and isostatic forces. After sufficient thinning of the lithosphere, this serpentinized material is emplaced at the continent-ocean transition. This is why the transitional crust of NVPM are made of serpentinized peridotite instead of magmatic structures seen in VPM. Since the emplacement of the peridotite, oceanic crust has been forming at the Mid-Atlantic Ridge and driving the two NVPM apart. The simple shear detachment became a deactivated detachment fault once this rifting process began the formation of new oceanic crust. This process explains the structures seen at the Galicia margin today.

== Geographic distribution ==
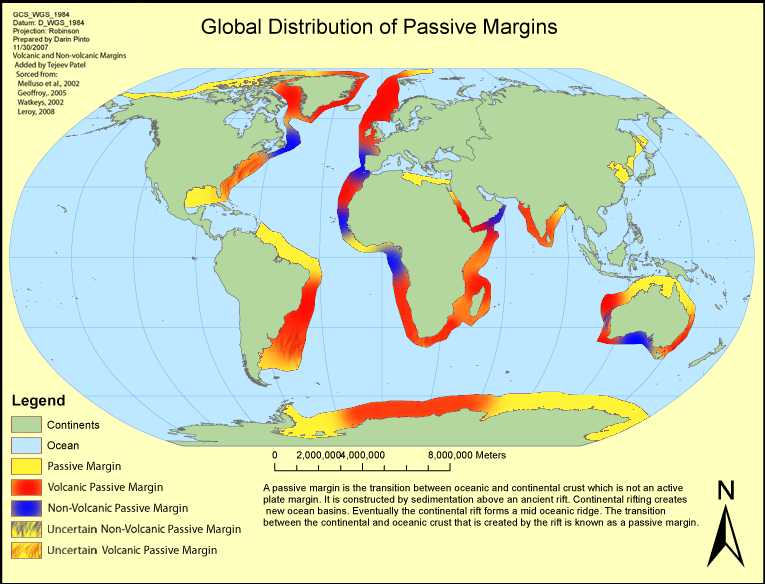

== Additional Reading ==
- Brun, J.P.; Beslier, M.O. (1996). "Mantle exhumation at passive margins". Journal of Earth and Planetary Science Letters. 142 (1–2): 161–173. Bibcode:1996E&PSL.142..161B. doi:10.1016/0012-821X(96)00080-5.
- Ebbing, J.; Gernigon, L.; Pascal, C. (2007). "Structural and Thermal Control on the Depth to Bottom of Magnetic Sources – A Case Study from the Mid – Norwegian Margin". EGM 2007 International Workshop: Innovation in EM, Grav and Mag Methods.
- Keen, Charlotte; Keen, Charlotte; Reid, Ian; Louden, Keith E. (1995). "Evolution of non volcanic rifted margins: New results from the conjugate margins of the Labrador Sea". Journal of Geology. 23 (7): 589–592. Bibcode:1995Geo....23..589C. doi:10.1130/0091-7613(1995)023<0589:EONRMN>2.3.CO;2.
- Lyman, Greg (2008). "The use of gravity anomaly data for offshore continental margin demarcation". The Leading Edge. 27 (6): 720–727. Bibcode:2008LeaEd..27..722P. doi:10.1190/1.2944156.
- Gilles, Chazoti; S. Chappentieri; J. Kornprobsti; R. Vannucciz; B.A. Luaise (2005). "Lithospheric Mantle Evolution during Continental Break-Up: The West Iberia Non-Volcanic Passive Margin". Journal of Petrology. 46 (12): 2527–2568. Bibcode:2005JPet...46.2527C. doi:10.1093/petrology/egi064.
- Leroy, Marie; Gueydan, Frederic; Dauteuil, Olivier (2008). "Uplift and strength evolution of passive margins inferred from 2-D conductive modeling". Geophysical Journal International. 172 (1): 464–476. Bibcode:2008GeoJI.172..464L. doi:10.1111/j.1365-246X.2007.03566.x.
- Little, Robert J. (1999). Whole Earth Geophysics. Prentice-Hall, Inc. pp. 237–257. ISBN 978-0-13-490517-4.
- Manatschal, Gianreto; Bernoulli, Daniel (1999). "Architecture and tectonic evolution of nonvolcanic margins: Present-day Galicia and ancient Adria" (PDF). Tectonics. 18 (6): 1099–1119. Bibcode:1999Tecto..18.1099M. doi:10.1029/1999TC900041. S2CID 129380326.
- Moores, Eldridge M.; Twiss, Robert J. (1995). Tectonics. W.H. Freeman Company. pp. 16–20, 97–104. ISBN 978-0-7167-2437-7.
- Pichon, Xavier Le; Sibuet, Jean- Claude (1981). "Passive Margins: A Model of Formation". Journal of Geophysical Research. 86 (B5): 3708–3720. Bibcode:1981JGR....86.3708L. doi:10.1029/JB086iB05p03708.
- Sibuet, Jean-Claude (1992). "Formation of non-volcanic passive margins: A composite model applies to the conjugate Galicia and Southeastern Flemish Cap margins". Geophysical Research Letters. 19 (8): 769–772. Bibcode:1992GeoRL..19..769S. doi:10.1029/91GL02984.
- Skogseid, Jakob (2001). "Volcanic margins: geodynamic and exploration aspects". Marine and Petroleum Geology. 18 (4): 457–461. Bibcode:2001MarPG..18..457S. doi:10.1016/S0264-8172(00)00070-2.
- Soares, Duarte M.; Alves, Tiago M.; Terrinha, Pedro (2012). "The breakup sequence and associated lithospheric breakup surface: Their significance in the context of rifted continental margins (West Iberia and Newfoundland margins, North Atlantic)". Journal of Earth and Planetary Science Letters. 355–356: 311–326. Bibcode:2012E&PSL.355..311S. doi:10.1016/j.epsl.2012.08.036.
- Watts, A.B.; Fairhead, J.D. (1999a). "The rift-to-drift development of". The Leading Edge. 18 (2): 258–263. doi:10.1190/1.1438270.
- Watts, A.B.; Fairhead, J.D. (1999b). "A process-oriented approach to modeling the gravity signature of continental margins". The Leading Edge. 18 (2): 258–263. Bibcode:1999LeaEd..18..258W. doi:10.1190/1.1438270.
- Whitmarsh, R.B; Wallace, P.J. "The rift-to-drift development of the West Iberia Nonvolcanic Continental Margin: Summary and Review of the Contribution of Ocean Drilling Program Leg 173". Texas A&M University, Proceedings of the Ocean Drilling Program, Scientific Results. 173.
- Wilson, R.C.L (2001). Non-volcanic rifting of continental margins; a comparison of evidence from land and sea. Vol. 187. Geological Society of London : London, United Kingdom. pp. 258–263. ISBN 978-1-86239-091-1.
- Ziegler, P.A.; Cloetingh, S. (2004). "Dynamic processes controlling evolution of rifted basin". Earth-Science Reviews. 64 (1–2): 1–50. Bibcode:2004ESRv...64....1Z. doi:10.1016/S0012-8252(03)00041-2.
- "Geology of the Scotian Margin. Geophysical characteristics". Geological Survey of Canada. Archived from the original on 2009-01-23.
