= Volcanic passive margin =

Form of transitional crust

Volcanic passive margins (VPM) and non-volcanic passive margins are the two forms of transitional crust that lie beneath passive continental margins that occur on Earth as the result of the formation of ocean basins via continental rifting. Initiation of igneous processes associated with volcanic passive margins occurs before and/or during the rifting process depending on the cause of rifting. There are two accepted models for VPM formation: hotspots/mantle plumes and slab pull. Both result in large, quick lava flows over a relatively short period of geologic time (i.e. a couple of million years). VPM's progress further as cooling and subsidence begins as the margins give way to formation of normal oceanic crust from the widening rifts.

== Characteristics ==
Despite the differences in origin and formation, most VPMs share the same characteristics:

- 4 to 7 km thick basaltic and (frequently) silicic subaerial flows; dike swarms and sills running parallel to continent-facing normal faults.
- 10 to 15 km thick bodies in the lower crust (HVLC) show high seismic P-Wave velocities, between 7.1 and 7.8 km/s which lie under the transitional crust (crust between continental crust and oceanic crust).
- Seaward Dipping Reflector (SDR) series: Inner SDRs overlie transitional continental crust. They are composed of varying mixtures of subaerial volcanic flows, volcaniclastic and non-volcanic sediments which range from 50 to 150 km wide and are 5–10 km thick. Outer SDRs overlie transitional oceanic crust and are composed of submarine basaltic flows which range from 3 to 9 km thick.

== Development ==
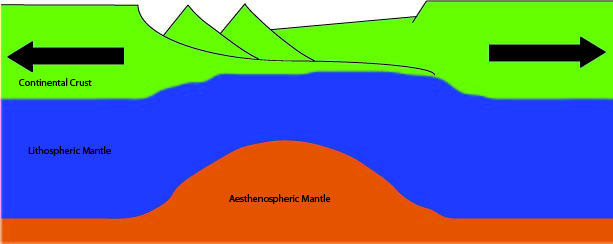
Not to scale Extensional stress leads to asthenospheric upwelling and Listric Faulting.

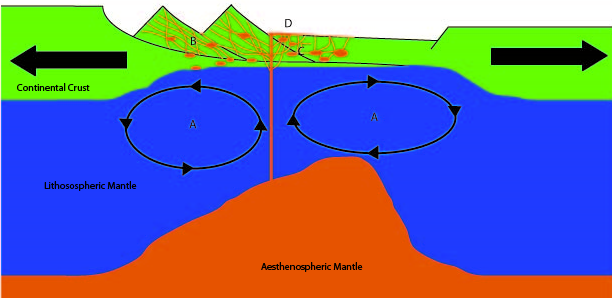
Not to scale Asthenospheric upwelling, listric faulting, and crustal thinning continue. Mantle convection (A) further weakens lithosphere and leads to the formation of dikes and sills (B). Dikes and sills feed magma chambers in the lower and upper crust (C). Lava erupts as basaltic sheet flows (D).

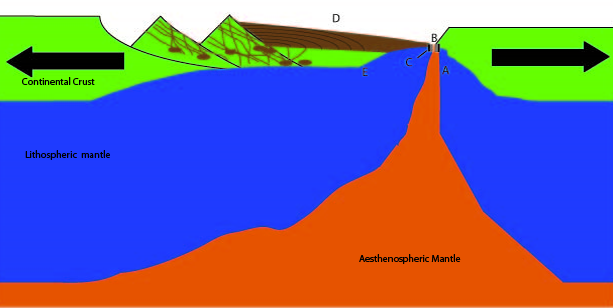
Not to scale Thinning crust is strained to the point of breaking, forming a mid-ocean ridge (A). Mantle material upwells to fill the gap at the mid-ocean ridge (B) and cools to form oceanic crust (C). Volcanic sheet flows atop transitional oceanic crust form outer seaward dipping reflectors (D). Convecting mantle material along base of transitional crust cools to form HVLC (E).

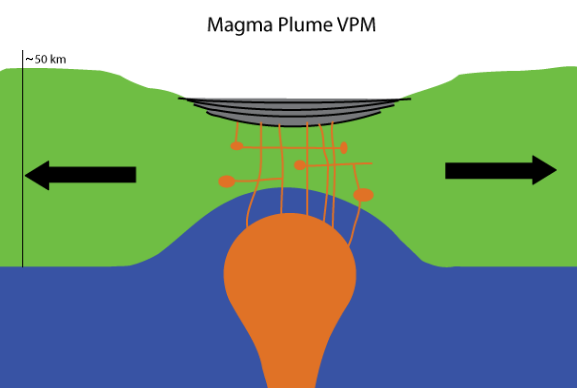
Extension thins the crust. Magma reaches the surface through radiating sills and dikes, forming basalt flows, as well as deep and shallow magma chambers below the surface. The crust gradually sink due to thermal subsidence, and originally horizontal basalt flows are rotated tosees become seaward dipping reflectors.

=== Rift initiation ===
==== Active rifting ====
The active rift model sees rupture driven by hotspot or mantle plume activity. Upwellings of hot mantle, known as mantle plumes, originate deep in Earth and rise to heat and thin the lithosphere. Heated lithosphere thins, weakens, rises, and finally rifts, Enhanced melting following continental breakup is very important in VPMs, creating thicker than normal oceanic crust of 20 to 40 km thick. Other melts caused by convection related upwelling form reservoirs of magma from which dike swarms and sills eventually radiate to the surface, creating the characteristic seaward dipping lava flows. This model is controversial.

==== Passive rifting ====
The passive rift model infers that slab pull stretches the lithosphere and thins it. To compensate for lithospheric thinning, asthenosphere upwells, melts due to adiabatic decompression, and derivative melts rise to the surface to erupt. Melts push up through faults towards the surface, forming dikes and sills.

=== Development of transitional crust ===
Continued extension leads to accelerated igneous activity, including repeated eruptions. Repeated eruptions form a thick sequence of lava beds that can reach a combined thickness of up to 20 km. These beds are identified on seismic refraction sections as seaward dipping reflectors. The early phase of volcanic activity is not limited to the production of basalts. Rhyolite and other felsic rocks can also be found in these zones.

Continued extension with volcanic activity forms transitional crust, welding ruptured continent to nascent ocean floor. Volcanic beds cover the transition from thinned continental crust to oceanic crust. Also occurring during this phase is the formation of high velocity seismic zones under the thinned continental crust and the transitional crust. These zones are identified by typical seismic velocities between 7.2 and 7.7 km/s and are usually interpreted as layers of mafic to ultramafic rocks that have underplated the transitional crust. Asthenospheric upwelling leads to the formation of a mid-ocean ridge and new oceanic crust progressively separates the once-conjoined rift halves. Continued volcanic eruptions spread lava flows across transitional crust and onto oceanic crust. Due to the high rate of magmatic activity the new oceanic crust forms much thicker than typical oceanic crust. Some have theorized that the copious amounts of volcanic material also lead to the formation of oceanic plateaus at this time.

=== Post-rift ===
The final and longest phase is the continued thermal subsidence of the transitional crust and the accumulation of sediments. Continued seafloor spreading leads to the formation of oceanic crust of normal thickness. Over time this production of normal oceanic crust and sea floor spreading leads to the formation of an ocean. This phase is of the most interest to the oil industry and sedimentary geologists.

== Distribution and examples ==
The distribution of known volcanic margins is shown on the graphic to the right. Many of the margins have not been thoroughly investigated and more passive margins are identified as volcanic from time to time.

Volcanic passive margins:

- South Atlantic
- Western Australia
- Southwest India
- West Greenland
- East Greenland
- Northern Labrador Sea
- South of Arabia
- Norwegian Margin
- US Atlantic Margin

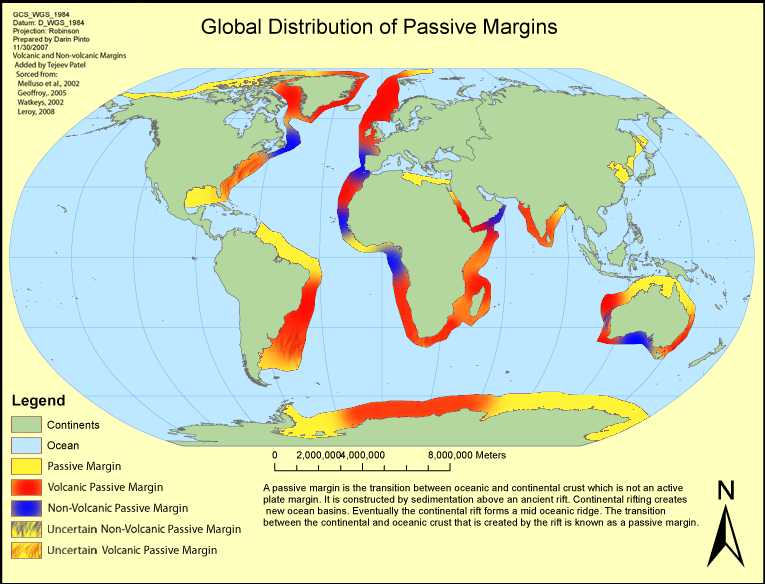
Map showing the distribution of Earth's passive margins with known volcanic and non-volcanic margins distinguished. The margins are marked with color masks where the darkest blues and reds are non-volcanic and volcanic passive margins, respectively.

=== VPM example: The US Atlantic Margin ===
The US Atlantic passive margin extends from Florida to southern Nova Scotia. This VPM was a result of the breakup of the supercontinent, Pangea, in which North America separated from northwestern Africa and Iberia to form the North Atlantic Ocean. This margin has a typical history of tectonic events that are representative of volcanic passive margins with rifting and passive margin formation occurring 225-165 million years ago. Like other VPMs the US East Coast Margin developed in two stages: First, rifting, initiated during the Middle to Late Triassic and continued into Jurassic time and, second, seafloor spreading, which began in Jurassic time and continues today. The US East Coast includes several components which are characteristic of VPM's including seaward-dipping reflectors, flood basalts, dikes, and sills.
