= Depocenter =

A depocenter or depocentre in geology is the part of a sedimentary basin where a particular rock unit has its maximum thickness. Depending on the controls on subsidence and the sedimentary environment, the location of a basin's depocenter may vary with time, such as in active rift basins as extensional faults grow, link or become abandoned.
