= Sulfur mineral =

Sulfur mineral may refer to any of the following types of minerals that contain sulfur (S) atoms:

- Native sulfur, sulfur that occurs naturally in crystalline form
  - Octasulfur (S_{8}), the most common allotrope of sulfur found in nature
- Sulfate mineral, a mineral containing the sulfate ion (SO_{4}^{2−})
- Sulfide mineral, a mineral containing the sulfide (S^{2−}) or disulfide ion (S_{2}^{2−})

== See also ==
- Allotropes of sulfur
