= Nias Basin =

- Location within Indonesia

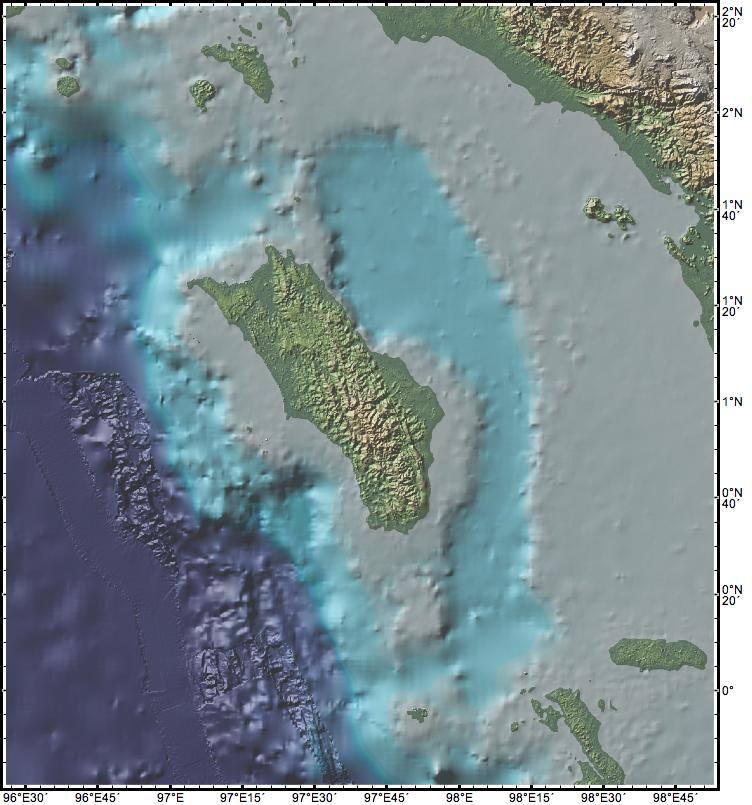
- Coordinates: 1°15′0″N 98°0′0″E
- Etymology: Island of Nias
- Country: Indonesia

Characteristics
- On/Offshore: Offshore

Geology
- Basin type: Forearc basin

The Nias Basin (also known as the West Sumatra or Sibolga Basin) is a forearc basin located off the western coast of Sumatra, Indonesia, in the Indian Ocean. The name is derived from the island that bounds its western edge, the island of Nias. The Nias Basin, the island of Nias (which is a subaerial part of the accretionary complex), and the offshore, submarine accretionary complex, together form a Forearc region on the Sunda plate/Indo-Australian plate collisional/subduction boundary. The Forearc region is the area between an oceanic trench and its associated volcanic arc. The oceanic trench associated with the Nias Basin is the Sunda Trench, and the associated volcanic arc is the Sunda Arc.

The Nias Basin itself is structurally bounded to the west by the Mentawai Fault and bounded to the east by the Volcanic Arc island of Sumatra. It is a geologically independent basin from its neighbor basins; the Simeulue Basin to the north, and the Mentawai and Enggano Basin to the south. The Nias Basin spans ~250 kilometer length-wise, and ~100 kilometers width-wise. Overall, the Nias Basin can be divided into two sub-basins; the Singkel Basin to the north, and the Pini Basin to the south. These basins are distinguished by their independent development during the early formation of the primary basin, but later consolidated when subsidence of the area was more unified over the whole Nias Basin region.

== Basin formation ==
The history of the Nias Basin begins with the initial subduction of the Indo-Australian plate underneath the Sunda plate. Subduction of this plate, which was rich in water and volatiles, caused flux melting to occur in the mantle. This new magma eventually rose through the overriding plate, and formed the Sunda Arc. The sediment supply, and convergence rate in this case were adequate enough to allow for the Forearc to develop into an Accretionary Convergent Margin. This type of Forearc results in an accretionary complex forming along the Forearc-trench boundary, which resulted in uplift of that region. Uplift due to accretion formed a Forearc Ridge, which the island of Nias is part of. The resulting depression that formed between the Forearc Ridge and the primary volcanic ridge (Sunda Arc), allows for sediment deposition in that region. This depression in this case formed the Nias Basin. Presently, the Nias Basin lies under about 610 meters of water at its deepest point.

The Nias Basin can be divided into 2 sub-basins; the Pini Basin to the South, and the Singkel Basin to the North. These basins evolved independently from each other originally during a time of sea-level regression. These sub-basins themselves are bounded by normal faults, which were formed due to depression of the region during sediment subsidence, and extension events.

The Nias Basin itself is relatively shallow compared to its surrounding basins. This could be due to more carbonate reef activity in this region creating thicker carbonate deposits in the Nias Basin, resulting in more sediment deposition, and shallower water depth.

== Stratigraphy ==
The basement rock of the Nias Basin, at its greatest depth lies at about 4-6 kilometers under the seafloor. This basement rock was determined to be the remains of an older accretionary complex that formed before the Indo-Australian/Sunda collision. The stratigraphic sequence of this basin can be divided into 3 primary sequences.

=== 1st sequence – Pre-Neogene ===
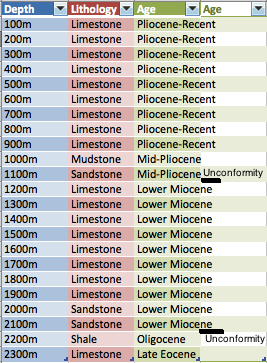
Stratigraphy of Nias Basin

The lowest and oldest sequence consists of rocks that date to around the late Eocene. These rocks include pyritic shales, dolomitic limestones, and calcareous mudstones. Above these rocks lie various volcanoclastic sandstones and claystones from the early Oligocene.

=== 2nd sequence – Lower Miocene-Upper Miocene ===
Above the Pre-Neogene sequence lies a major unconformity, overlain by early Miocene rocks. This unconformity is the result of the area being subjected to subaerial erosion, but then was followed by a marine transgression, which deposited the overlaying Miocene rocks. This transgression originally deposited near-shore sands, followed by shallow water siltstones. Towards the middle Miocene, the region developed into a carbonate shelf, and these carbonates make up the rest of this sequence. During the late Miocene, these carbonates were buried by large quantities of clastic sediments originating from the uplift of Sumatra during this time. These sediments deposited faster than the rate of subsidence in the region, creating a continental shelf and slope in the west of the basin. The newly formed continental slope deposited turbidites over the early-middle Miocene sediment that the shelf did not cover. This Sequence is about 1000 meters thick. After the middle Miocene, there lies an unconformity which represents a ~10 million year depositional hiatus.

=== 3rd sequence – Lower Pliocene-Recent ===
This sequence, which is also ~1000 meters thick begins with an unconformity which lies at the top of the previous sequence. During this time, clastic sediments continue to be deposited, resulting in the shelf prograding further west, while the deep regions of the basin see continued turbidite deposition.

=== Stratigraphic interpretations ===
Beginning with the 1st sequence, the lithologies are consistent with the formation of the basin along with the volcanic arc, the deposition of the volcanic arc sediments, and ultimate uplift of the basin region, which causes the erosional unconformity. The 2nd sequence stratigraphy displays a marine transgression, and ends with an erosional unconformity. This unconformity could be caused by subaerial erosion due to a regression following the transgression, but it is unknown because that stratigraphy has been eroded. The 3rd sequence shows a marine transgressive event following the previous unconformity, leading into the present day.

== Geologic structures ==
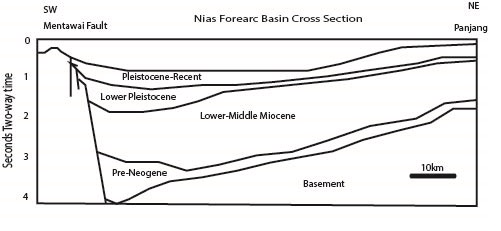
Cross Section of Nias Basin

The Nias Basin is an asymmetric basin, with the Mentawai Fault bounding its Western edge. The Mentawai Fault is a transform fault that parallels the Sunda Trench, and separates the accretionary complex of the fore-arc, from the fore-arc basin. This fault is the result of the oblique subduction nature of the Indo-Australian plate. The Mentawai Fault also has a normal fault component to its behavior as well, assisting in the formation of the fore-arc basin, as well as creating more space for sediment deposition and subsidence. The motion of the Mentawai Fault also results in accessory faults within the Nias Basin itself. These faults are also normal/transform in nature, and are the faults that bound the 2 sub-basins within the Nias Basin. These smaller faults form ~30 degrees to the Mentawai Fault, and create graben-like structures.

== Natural resources ==
The forearc basin depositional environment is characterized by a low geo-thermal gradient. This relatively cool environment, along with the shallow nature of the seafloor as well as the depositional beds provide a welcoming setting for the creation of hydrocarbons. The coal beds above the second unconformity would be the source of these hydrocarbons, but this area has only just begun being explored for oil/natural gas.
