= Continent-ocean boundary =

The continent-ocean boundary (COB) or continent-ocean transition (COT) or continent-ocean transition zone (COTZ) is the boundary between continental crust and oceanic crust on a passive margin or the zone of transition between these two crustal types. The identification of continent-ocean boundaries is important in the definition of plate boundaries at the time of break-up when trying to reconstruct the geometry and position of ancient continents e.g. in the reconstruction of Pangaea.

== Techniques used in identification ==
The following techniques are used either on their own or more commonly in combination.

=== Gravity data inversion ===
Moho depth can be derived by the inversion of satellite gravity data, taking into account the lithosphere thermal gravity anomaly. Crustal thickness can then be derived by subtracting this from the observed base of the drift (post break-up) sequence, normally from the interpretation of seismic reflection data.

=== Magnetic stripe data ===
Most areas of oceanic crust show characteristic stripes due to periodic magnetic reversals during formation at a mid-oceanic ridge. The continental crust is by contrast typically magnetically quiet. This method is dependent on stripes being present and will not work for oceanic crust created during the Cretaceous Quiet Zone. On some magma-rich margins stripes have also been identified within the transition zone.

=== Seismic reflection data ===
On normal incidence seismic reflection data recorded to sufficient depths, the Moho can in some areas be directly imaged, allowing the identification of normal thickness oceanic crust.

=== Wide-angle seismic refraction and reflection data ===
The combined use of seismic wide-angle reflection and refraction data give a precise location for the COB by determining the P-wave velocities along a profile. The two types of crust have distinct P-wave velocities.

== Economic importance ==
As hydrocarbon exploration moves further offshore to look for the remaining potential on passive margins, understanding the location of the COB is critical to predicting possible hydrocarbon occurrence. This is both from the likely location of source and reservoir rocks and the need to model the thermal effects of break-up in basin modelling
