= King's Cave =

Historic cave on the Isle of Arran

King’s Cave
- Fingal's Cave
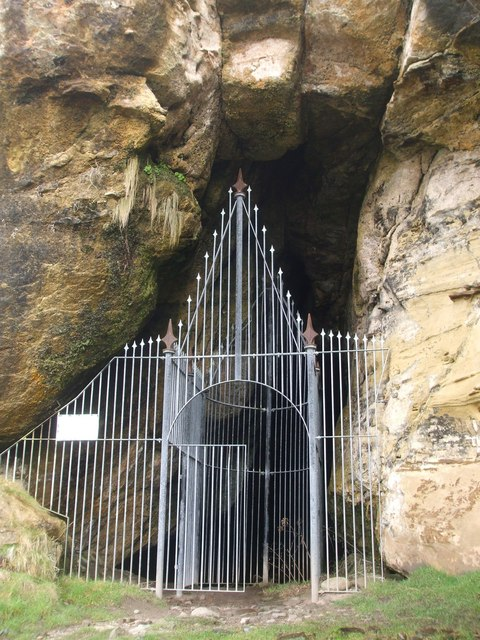
- Interactive map of King’s Cave
- Location: Isle of Arran
- OS grid: NR8836330937
- Coordinates: 55°31′31″N 5°21′12″W
- Entrances: 1
- Access: via public footpath

King's Cave (Scottish Gaelic: Uamh an Rìgh) is the largest of a series of seafront caves north of Blackwaterfoot on the Isle of Arran in Scotland. The caves were formed around 10,000 to 6,000 years ago during an ice age when the weight of an advancing glacier forced the land downward, so the sea was higher relative to the location of the cave, with high tide around 4 metres (13 ft) up from its present level. When the ice melted, the land rose due to the isostatic rebound effect, thus forming a raised shoreline or raised beach with relict sea-cliffs. The hillside above the cliffs has a shallow slope resulting from a much earlier raised beach, nominally 30 metres (98 ft) above present high tide.

Kilmory Parish church records suggest the cave may have been used for church meetings in the eighteenth century, and it is also said to have been used as a school. Before being known as the King's Cave it was known as Fingal's Cave after Fionn mac Cumhaill, a figure in Irish mythology.

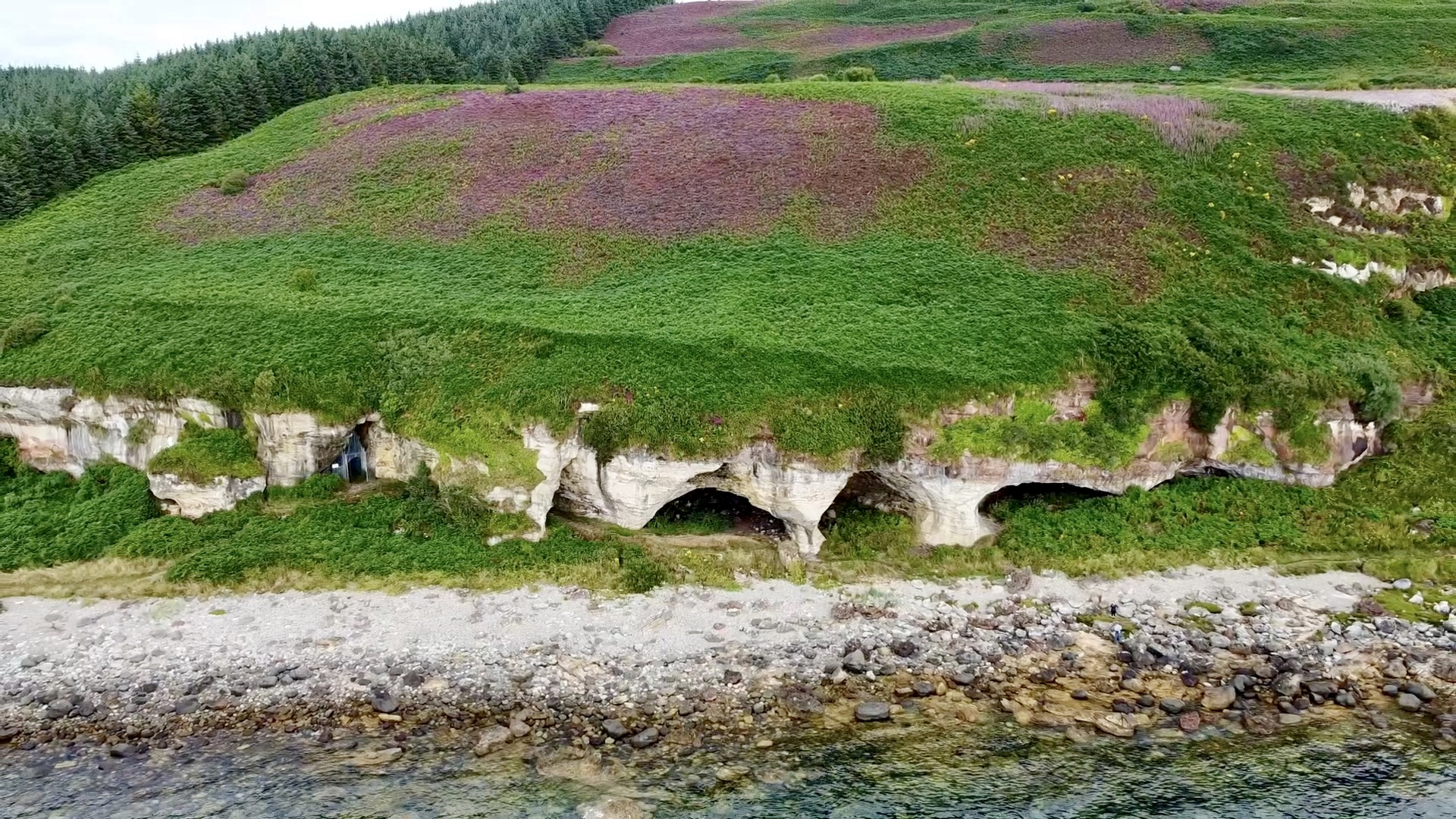
King's Cave (on the left) and adjacent caves on Arran's south-west coast

The current name of the cave is linked to the legend of Robert the Bruce seeking refuge in a cave where he is said to have been inspired by watching a spider's numerous and ultimately successful attempts to build a web, but this story is widely considered apocryphal.

In January 1909, an archeological dig was conducted within the cave. A 32 foot long trench was dug and examined, but aside from a small bronze ornament and some animal bones, nothing of interest was found, so the dig was halted on the fourth day.

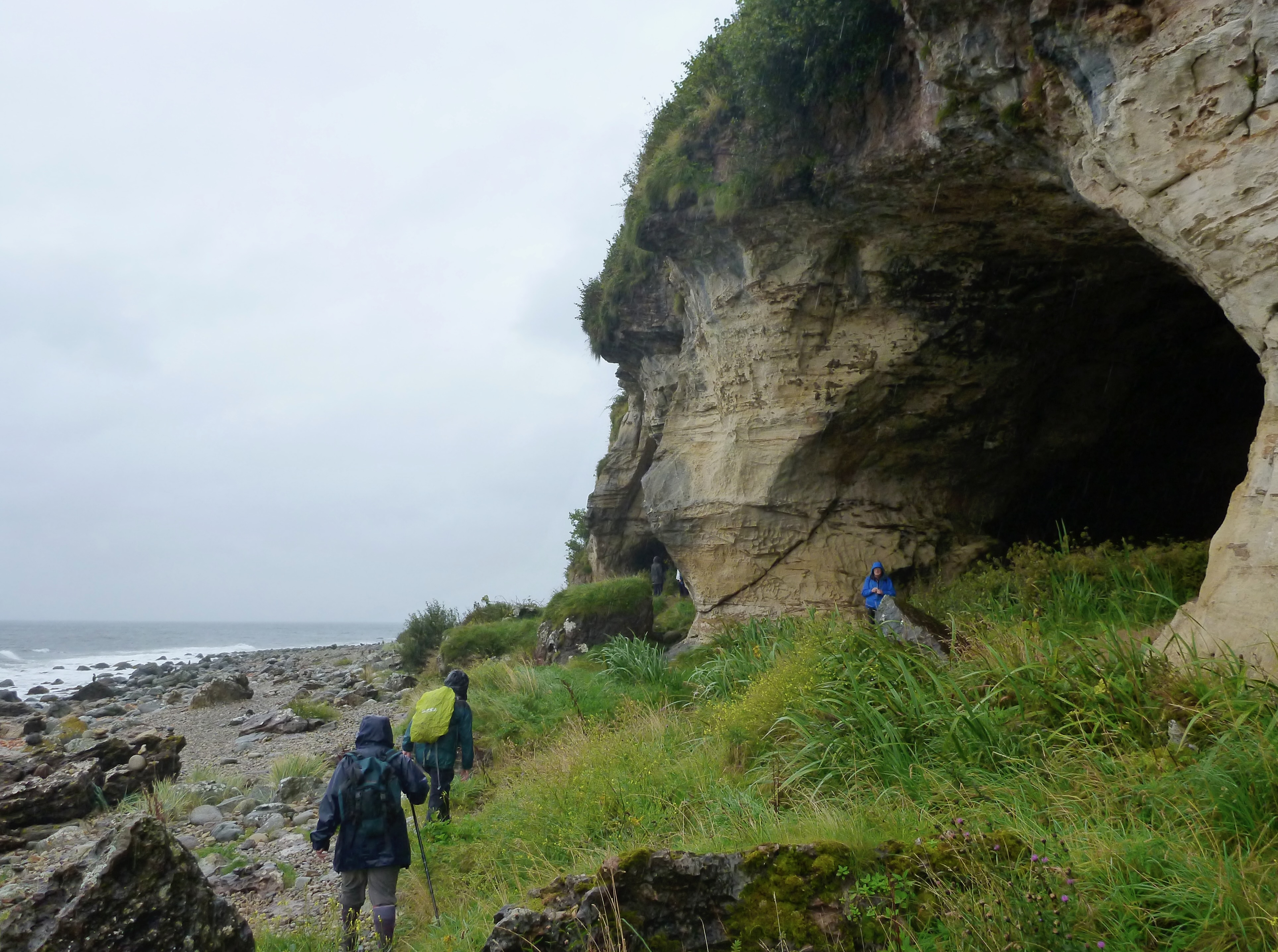
Approach from south along raised beach to King's Cave
