= Sea-level curve =

Graphic representation of changes of sea level through geological history

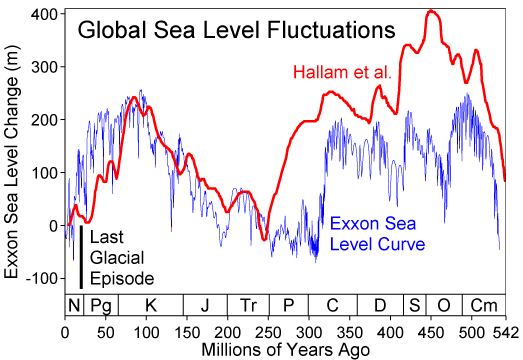
Comparison of two sea level reconstructions during the last 500 Myr: Exxon curve and Hallam curve. The scale of change during the last glacial/interglacial transition is indicated with a black bar.

The sea-level curve (also known as the eustatic curve) is the representation of the changes of the sea level relative to present day mean sea level as gleaned from the stratigraphic record throughout the geological history.

The first such curve is the Vail curve or Exxon curve. The names of the curve refer to the fact that in 1977 a team of Exxon geologists from Esso Production Research headed by Peter Vail published a monograph on seismic stratigraphic principles and global (eustatic)) sea-level changes. Their sea-level curve was based on seismic and biostratigraphic data accumulated during petroleum exploration.

The Vail curve (and the monograph itself) was the subject of debate among geologists, because it was based on undisclosed commercially confidential stratigraphic data, and hence not independently verifiable. Because of this, there were later efforts to establish a sea-level curve based on non-commercial, public domain data from outcrops exposed on land and thus verifiable by other researchers.

In 1987–1988 a revised eustatic sea-level curve for the Mesozoic and Cenozoic eras was published in Science magazine, now known as the Haq et al. sea-level curve, in reference to the marine geologist/oceanographer Bilal Haq

Bilal Haq and Stephen Schutter later published the Paleozoic sea-level curve in 2008 also in Science. Subsequent revisions of the Mesozoic eustatic sea-level curve have been published by Haq for the Cretaceous, Jurassic, and Triassic, respectively in 2014, 2017, and 2018. Haq and his co-workers have now completed the sea-level history of the entire Phanerozoic Eon.

== See also ==
- Sea level rise
- Sea level change
- Past changes in sea level
- Marine terrace
