= Palaeochannel =

Inactive river or stream channel that has been filled or buried

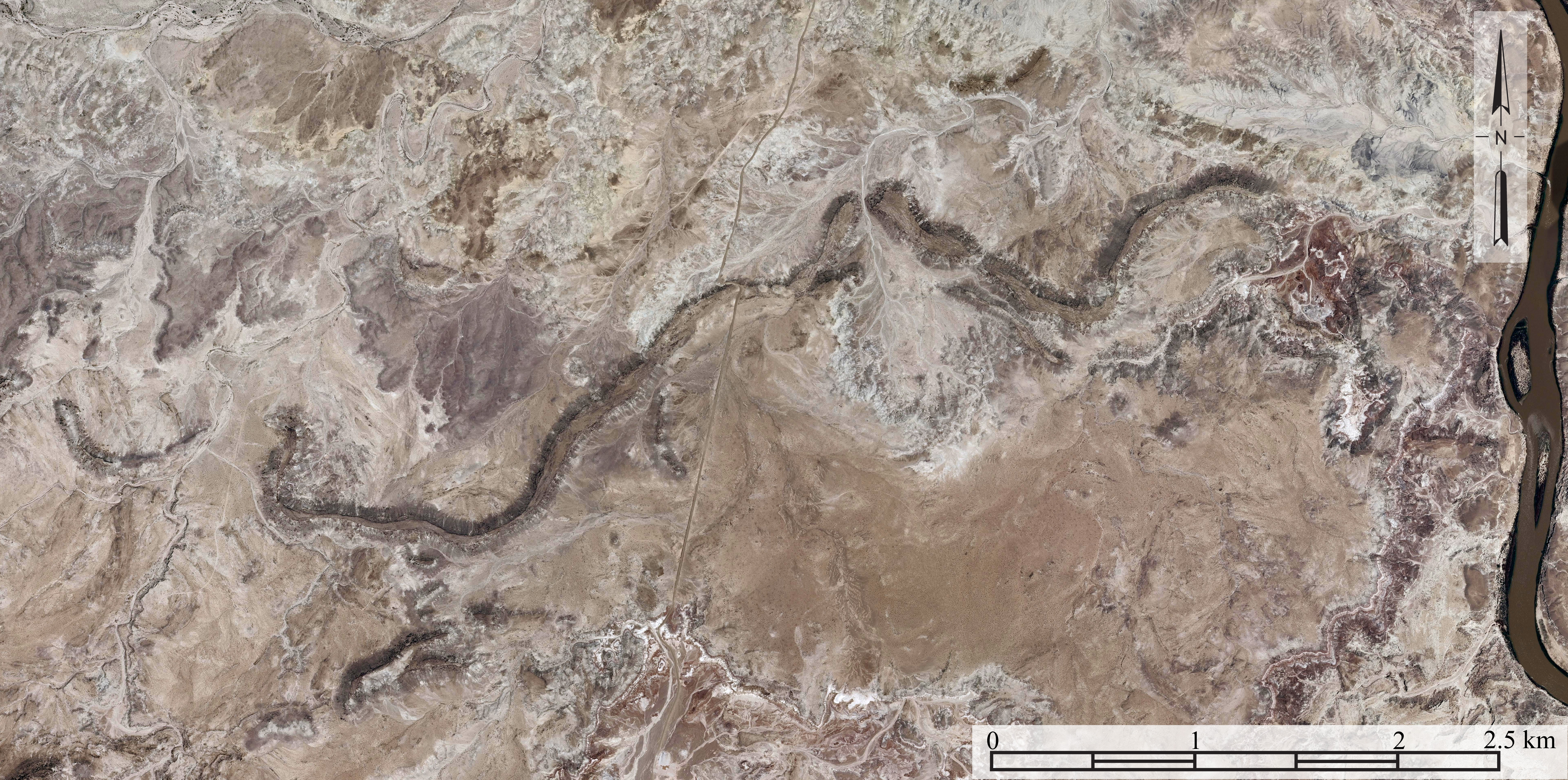
Aerial view of exhumed fluvial palaeochannel, Emery County, Utah. The erosion of softer surrounding mudstone left this palaeochannel as a sandstone ridge.

In the Earth sciences, a palaeochannel, also spelled paleochannel, is a significant length of a river or stream channel which no longer conveys fluvial discharge as part of an active fluvial system. The term palaeochannel is derived from the combination of two words, palaeo or old, and channel; i.e., a palaeochannel is an old channel. Palaeochannels may be preserved either as abandoned surface channels on the surface of river floodplains and terraces or infilled and partially or fully buried by younger sediments. The fill of a palaeochannel and its enclosing sedimentary deposits may consist of unconsolidated, semi-consolidated, or well-cemented sedimentary strata depending on the action of tectonics and diagenesis during their geologic history after deposition. The abandonment of an active fluvial channel and the resulting formation of a palaeochannel can be the result of tectonic processes, geomorphologic processes, anthropogenic activities, climatic changes, or a variable and interrelated combination of these factors.

== Formation ==
The avulsion of an active river or stream is the most common fluvial process resulting in the formation of palaeochannels. It is the process by which flow diverts out of an established river channel into a new permanent course on the adjacent floodplain. An avulsion can be either a full avulsion, in which all of the discharge is transferred out of the parent channel to a new one, or partial avulsion, in which only a portion of the discharge is transferred to a new one. Only the full avulsion results the formation of a palaeochannel. Partial avulsions result in the formation of anastomosing channels when the divided active channels rejoin downstream and distributary channels when the divided active channels do not rejoin downstream.

At least three broadly different types of avulsions, (a) avulsion by annexation; (b) avulsion by incision; and (c) avulsion by progradation, are recognized. First, an avulsion by annexation is an avulsion in which an existing active channel is appropriated or if an existing abandoned channel is reoccupied. Second, an avulsion by incision is an avulsion in which a new channel is created by the scouring into the floodplain surface as a direct result of the avulsion. Finally, an avulsion by progradation is an avulsion that results in the formation of an extensive deposition and multi-channeled distributive network. Of these types of avulsions only the avulsion by incision results in the complete abandonment and preservation of a fluvial channel as a palaeochannel.

The exact environmental conditions that favour incisional avulsions remain unsettled. However, it is generally agreed that they are promoted by a) rapid aggradation of the main channel and floodplain; b) wide unobstructed floodplain and down-valley drainage; and c) frequently recurring floods of high magnitude. In many floodplains, these conditions and frequent avulsions are correlated with superelevated alluvial ridges and river stages.

The event or factor that can trigger a specific avulsion may be either external or internal to a river system and quite varied. Factors external to a river system that might cause an avulsion include fault activity, sea-level rise, or an increase in flood peak discharge. Factors internal to a river system that might cause an avulsion include sediment influx, breakout along animal pathways, and blockage by ice jams, plant growth, log jams, and beaver dams.

== Recognition ==
A variety of techniques have been used to recognize and map palaeochannels. At first, surficial data from aerial photography, soils maps, topographic maps, archaeological surveys and excavations, and field observations were integrated with subsurface data from geological and engineering borings and cores to recognize and map palaeochannels. As the importance of coarse-grained fluvial deposits associated with palaeochannels as sources of groundwater and favoured conveyance of subsurface water became appreciated, geophysical techniques sensing the physical properties of underlying ground and bedrock and groundwater and other fluids contained within them became more important and widely used. For example, palaeochannels can be identified using airborne electromagnetic surveys, as the coarse-grained sediments are more electrically resistive than surrounding materials. Also, lidar, more sophisticated remote sensing techniques, digital analysis, including computer modeling, of data were added to the various techniques used to detect and map palaeochannels.

== Geological importance ==
Palaeochannels are important to the Earth sciences because the palaeohydrology of the prehistoric rivers that created them can be reconstructed from their morphology, and the sediments or sedimentary rocks filling palaeochannels often contain dateable material, fossils, and palaeoenvironmental proxies. The data derived from the analysis of their morphology and the fossils and palaeoenvironmental proxies can be used to study changes in regional palaeohydrology, palaeoclimates, and palaeoenvironments over geological and historic time scales. The morphology and distribution of palaeochannels can also be used to reconstruct the types, prehistory, and geometry of tectonic deformation, such as faulting, folding, uplift, and subsidence within an area.

Palaeochannels often preserve the form, width, and sinuosity of prehistoric river channels when they were active. This is important in reconstructing prehistoric climate and hydrology because empirical equations developed using data collected from modern rivers and streams can be used to calculate the approximate past hydrologic regime of a palaeochannel and the palaeoclimate associated with it. Such empirical equations also allow the estimation of palaeochannel gradient, meander wavelength, sinuosity, and discharge from a palaeochannel exposed in cross-section in an outcrop. The sediments or sedimentary rocks filling palaeochannels also often contain dateable material, micro- and megafossils, and palaeoenvironmental proxies. Fine-grained palaeochannel fills containing autochthonous vertebrate fossils may, in extremely favourable circumstances, contain unabraded, complete skeletons that are important for understanding habitat-specific palaeofaunas and associated palaeoenvironments. Fine-grained palaeochannel fills also frequently contain wood, leaves, and palynomorphs that can be used for geologic dating and understanding palaeoclimatic and other palaeoenvironmental conditions, including past rainfall, temperatures and climates, and prehistoric and historic climate change and global warming. Finally, the theoretical equilibrium profiles of rivers and streams provide a datum by which to detect and quantify tectonic processes such as faulting, uplift, and subsidence. Examples of the displacement of palaeochannels by active faulting are shown by the lateral movement along the San Andreas fault where it crosses Wallace Creek in central California, and where a fault of the Baton Rouge fault zone vertically offsets a Pleistocene palaeochannel and palaeo-floodplain of the Amite River near Denham Springs, Louisiana.

== Palaeochannel-hosted mineral deposits ==
Economically important mineral deposits may be hosted in palaeochannels and associated fluvial deposits. The most important of these deposits are syndepositional palaeo-placer deposits containing gold, cassiterite (tin ore), and platinum group minerals. In addition, diagenetic and postdepositional ores of uranium and iron have been found in palaeochannel fills.

Although layers of lignite and other types of coal are sometimes part of the sedimentary fill of palaeochannels, they are typically too thin and narrow to be economically mined. Also, they actually occur in palaeovalleys, which have been mislabeled as palaeochannels. Typically, when palaeochannels formed, they often partially or totally removed any underlying peat, the precursor to coal. Thus, where present, they are directly associated with areas of thin or missing coal called either wash-outs or coal wants. Wash-outs are a major problem for coal mining because of the drastic decrease in the total tonnage of mineable coal, and disruption to mining techniques. Also, bedding and jointing within strata comprising palaeochannels typically result in hazardous conditions related to unstable highwalls in opencast mines and collapsable roof rock in coal adits.

== Palaeochannels and aquifers ==
Coarse-grained (sandy) palaeochannels and palaeovalleys have been proposed as reservoirs or conduits for the preferential underground flow of fresh water. When they extend offshore beneath the continental shelf, they may either transfer freshwater offshore beneath the shelf, or act as pathways for saltwater intrusion into onshore aquifers. Smaller palaeochannels and palaeovalleys, which are commonly filled with muddy or clayey sediments can act as aquicludes that retard and act as barriers to the movement of groundwater.

== Palaeochannel versus palaeovalley ==
Palaeochannels are often confused with palaeovalleys (or paleovalleys) in the published literature and studies of groundwater and mineral resources. The nomenclature of palaeochannels must reflect their actual physical character, origin, and evolution if their relationship to mineral and groundwater resources is to be properly understood. Thus, it has been recommended that palaeochannel be used for an inactive channel formed by a river; palaeochannel deposits for the sediments that infill a palaeochannel; and palaeovalley for a valley incised by an ancient river.

This distinction is important, first because not all valleys and palaeovalleys are fluvial in origin; some of them may be either of glacial or tectonic origin. Other palaeovalleys are buried submarine canyons cut by turbidity currents and mass wasting. Second, even the deposits that fill a fluvial palaeovalley are not always fluvial sediments; often, fluvial palaeovalleys are filled and buried by some combination of fluvial, volcanic, glacial, aeolian, lacustrine, estuarine, or marine deposits. Finally, even when filled largely by fluvial sediments, the channel deposits that fill a palaeochannel comprise only a small fraction of a valley fill, which mainly consists of the deposits of other fluvial environments.

== See also ==
- Sedimentology
- Erosion
- Ore genesis
- Paleoshoreline
- Placer mining
- Uranium ore deposits
