= Calcaires de Laize =

Cambrian limestone unit in France

The Calcaires de Laize is a Cambrian limestone unit that crops out in Normandy, France. It was deposited during a sea level highstand, and overlies the siliciclastic schists and limestones of Carteret.

It is magnesium rich and penetrated by pre-Jurassic barites veins.
