= Wave-cut platform =

Narrow flat area created by erosion

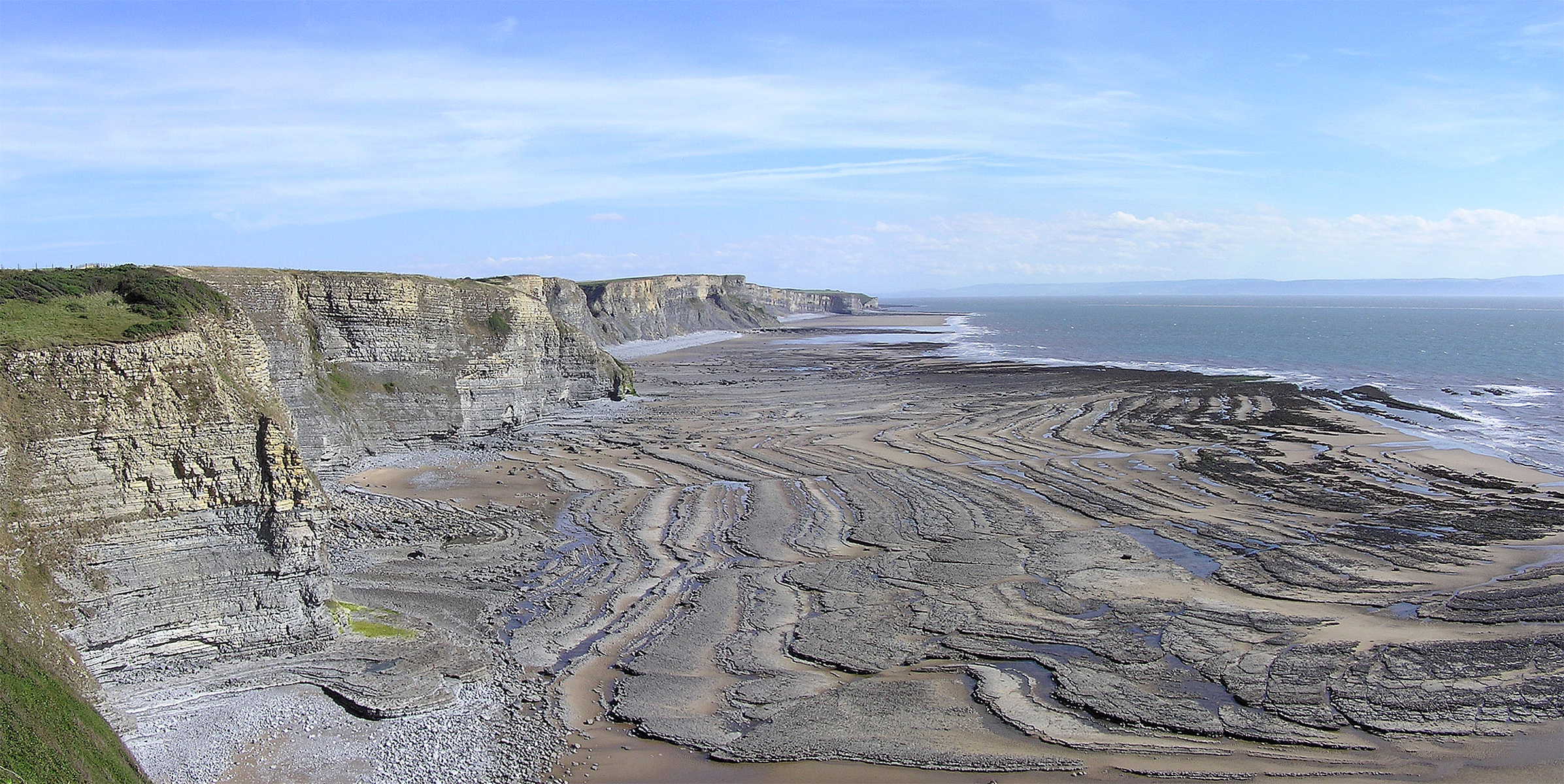
Wave-cut platform at Southerndown, South Wales, UK

A wave-cut platform, shore platform, coastal bench, or wave-cut cliff is the narrow flat area often found at the base of a sea cliff or along the shoreline of a lake, bay, or sea that was created by erosion. Wave-cut platforms are often most obvious at low tide when they become visible as huge areas of flat rock. Sometimes the landward side of the platform is covered by sand, forming the beach, and then the platform can only be identified at low tides or when storms move the sand.

== Formation ==
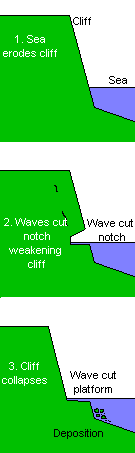
The formation of a wave-cut platform

Wave-cut platforms form when destructive waves hit against the cliff face, causing an undercut between the high and low water marks, mainly as a result of abrasion, corrosion and hydraulic action, creating a wave-cut notch. This notch then enlarges into a cave. The waves undermine this portion until the roof of the cave cannot hold due to the pressure and freeze-thaw or biological weathering acting on it, and collapses, resulting in the cliff retreating landward. The base of the cave forms the wave-cut platform as attrition causes the collapsed material to be broken down into smaller pieces, while some cliff material may be washed into the sea. This may be deposited at the end of the platform, forming an off-shore beach.

Because of the continual wave action, a wave-cut platform represents an extremely hostile environment and only certain organisms can utilize such a niche.

== Use of ancient examples ==
Ancient wave-cut platforms provide evidence of past sea and lake levels. Raised and abandoned platforms, sometimes found behind modern beaches, are evidence of higher sea levels in the geological past, and have been used to identify areas of isostatic adjustment. By using scientific dating methods, or examination of marine fossils found on the platform, it is possible to work out when the platform was formed, thus giving geographers and geologists information about sea levels at known times in the past. This has been used in the United Kingdom and other previously glaciated areas to calculate the rate at which land is rising now that it is no longer covered in ice.

Where the coastline itself is changing due to seismic action, there may be a series of platforms showing earlier sea levels and indicating the amount of uplift caused by various earthquakes.

== Usage of term 'wave-cut' ==
According to Trenhaile, Sunamura, and Massalink and Hughes, the term 'wave-cut platform' should no longer be used as it assumes that shore platforms are the result of wave action, which is not always true. Shore platforms, like comparable river and lake platforms, are erosional features that develop when removal of saprock and other debris by waves and currents leaves behind a bedrock surface below the water table.

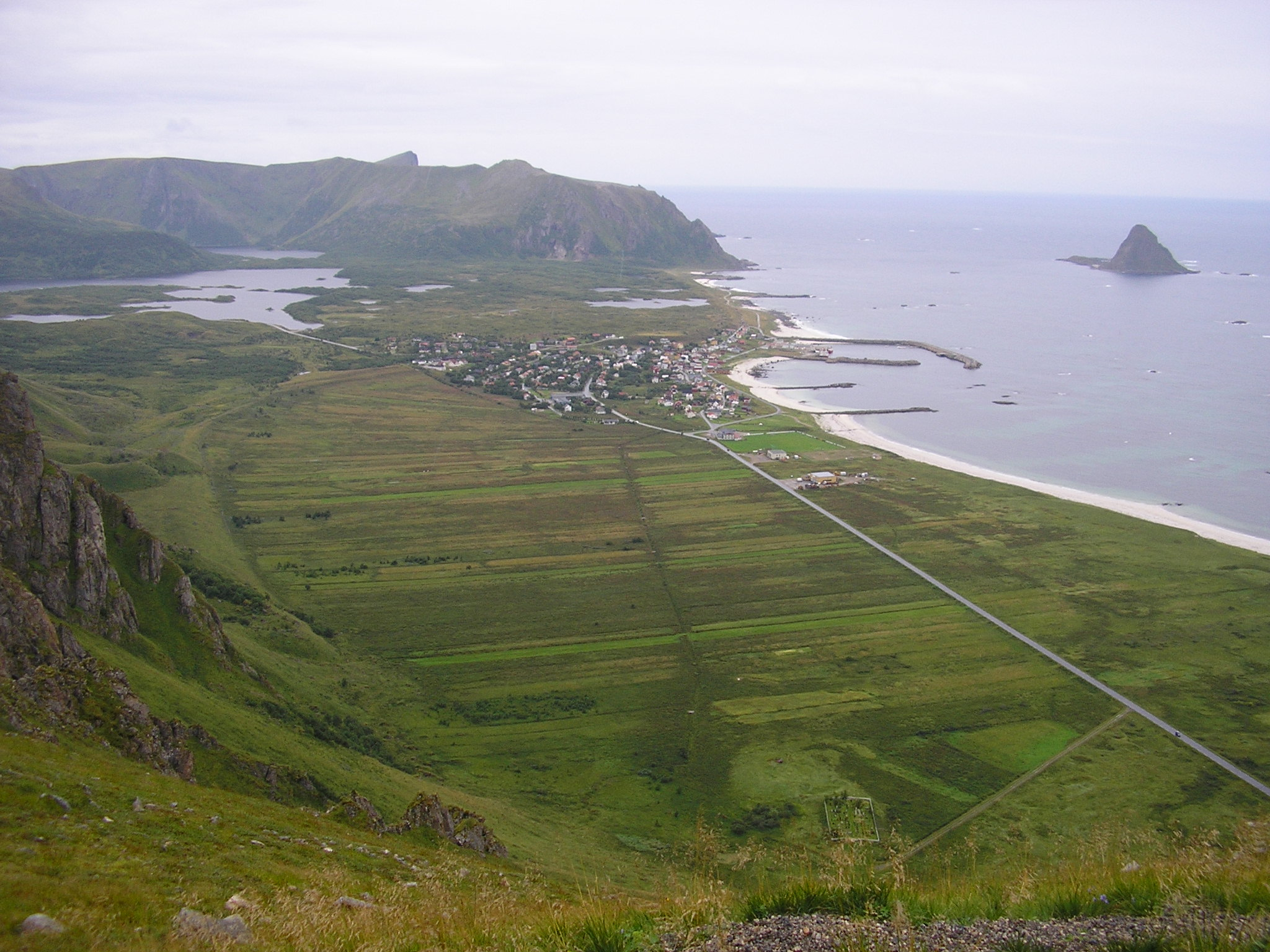
Raised beach and shore platform, Bleik, Norway

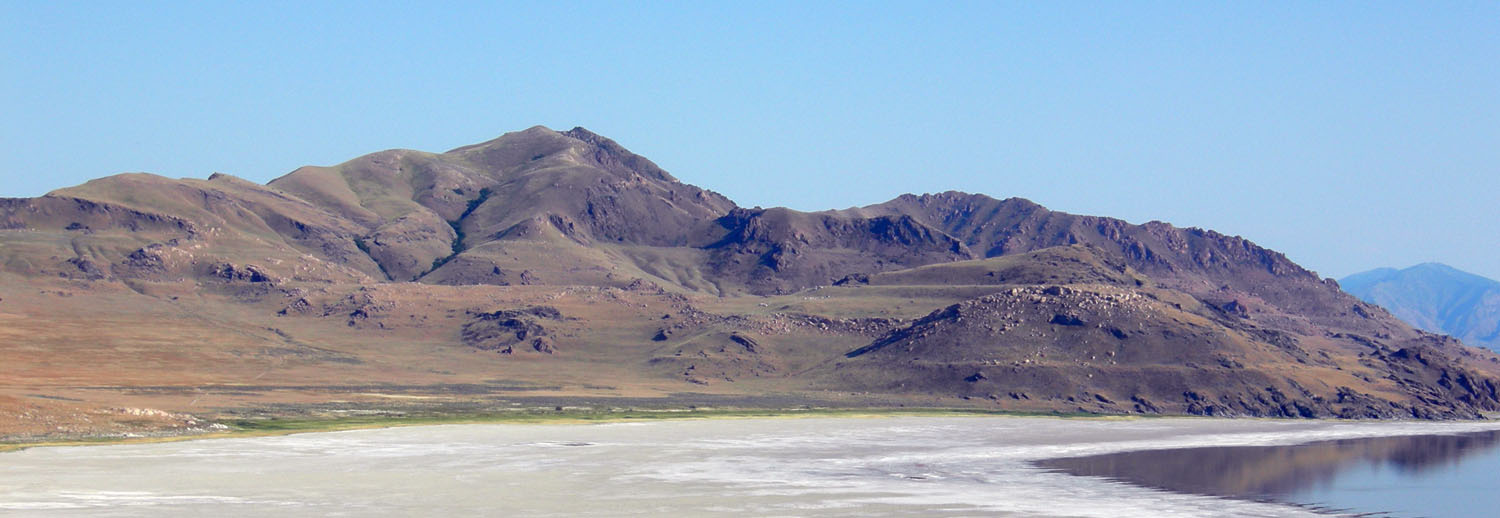
Shore platforms from Lake Bonneville (Pleistocene), Utah, United States

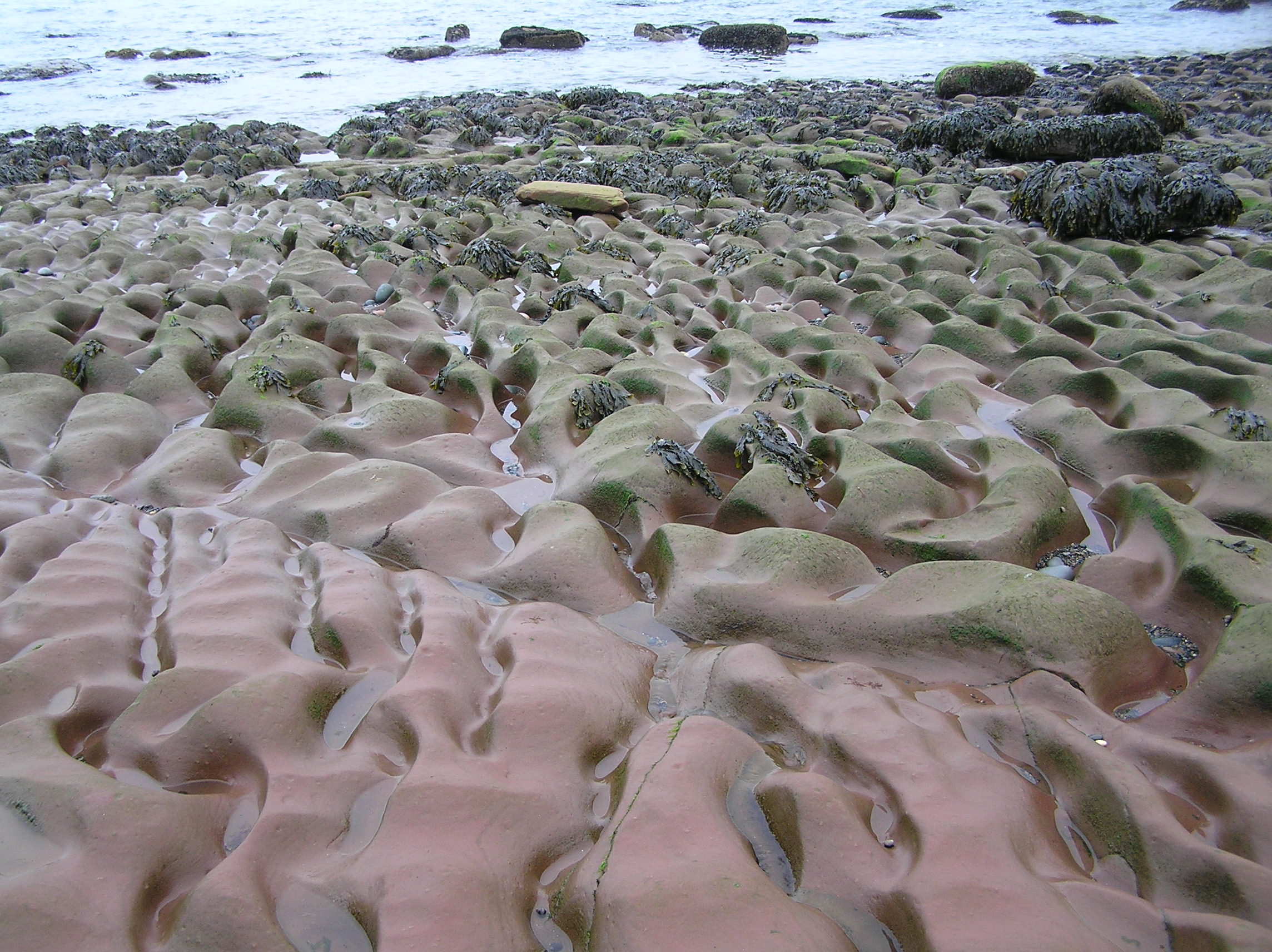
Shore platform at St Bees Head, UK

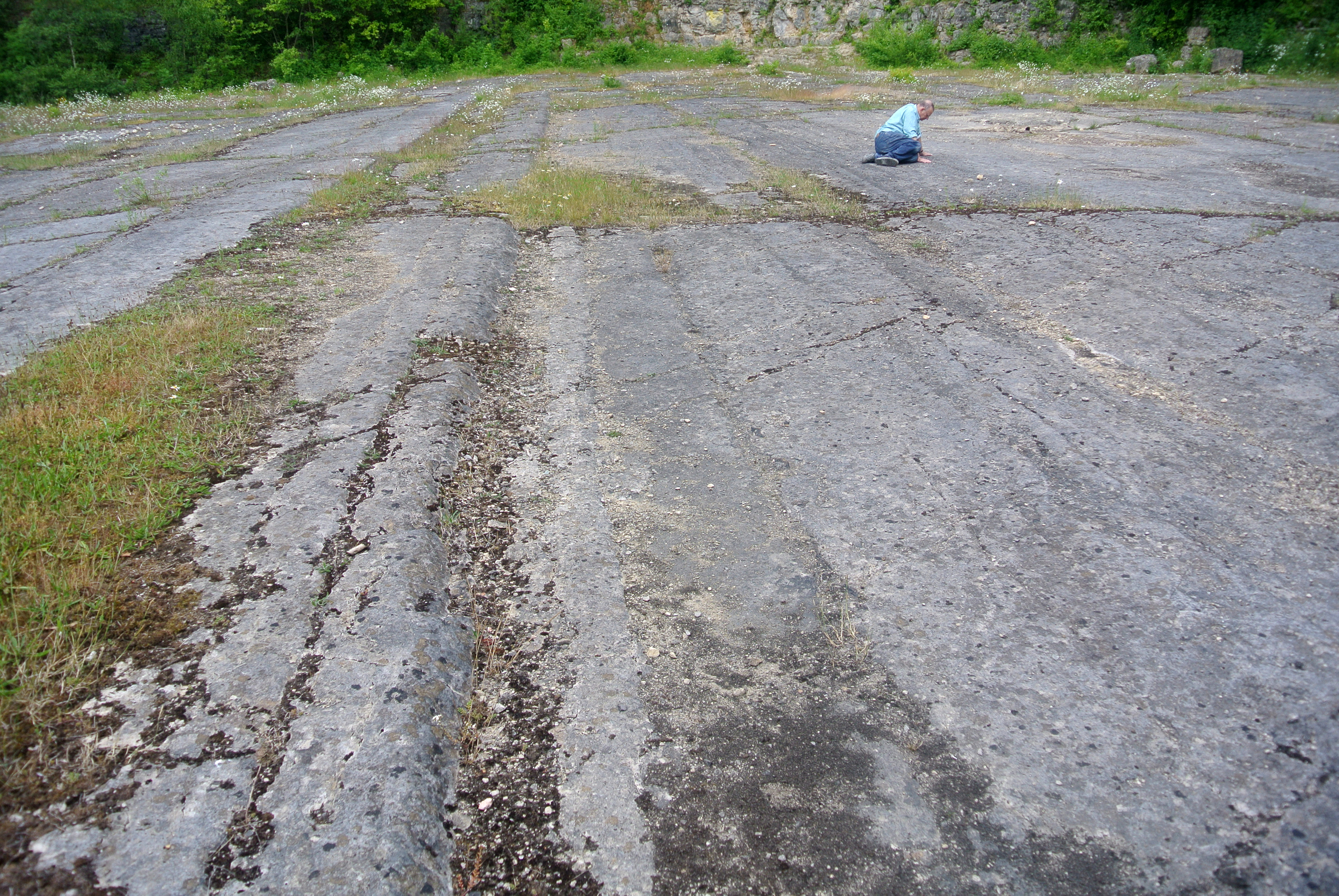
Jurassic wave-cut platform at Tedbury Camp, southern England

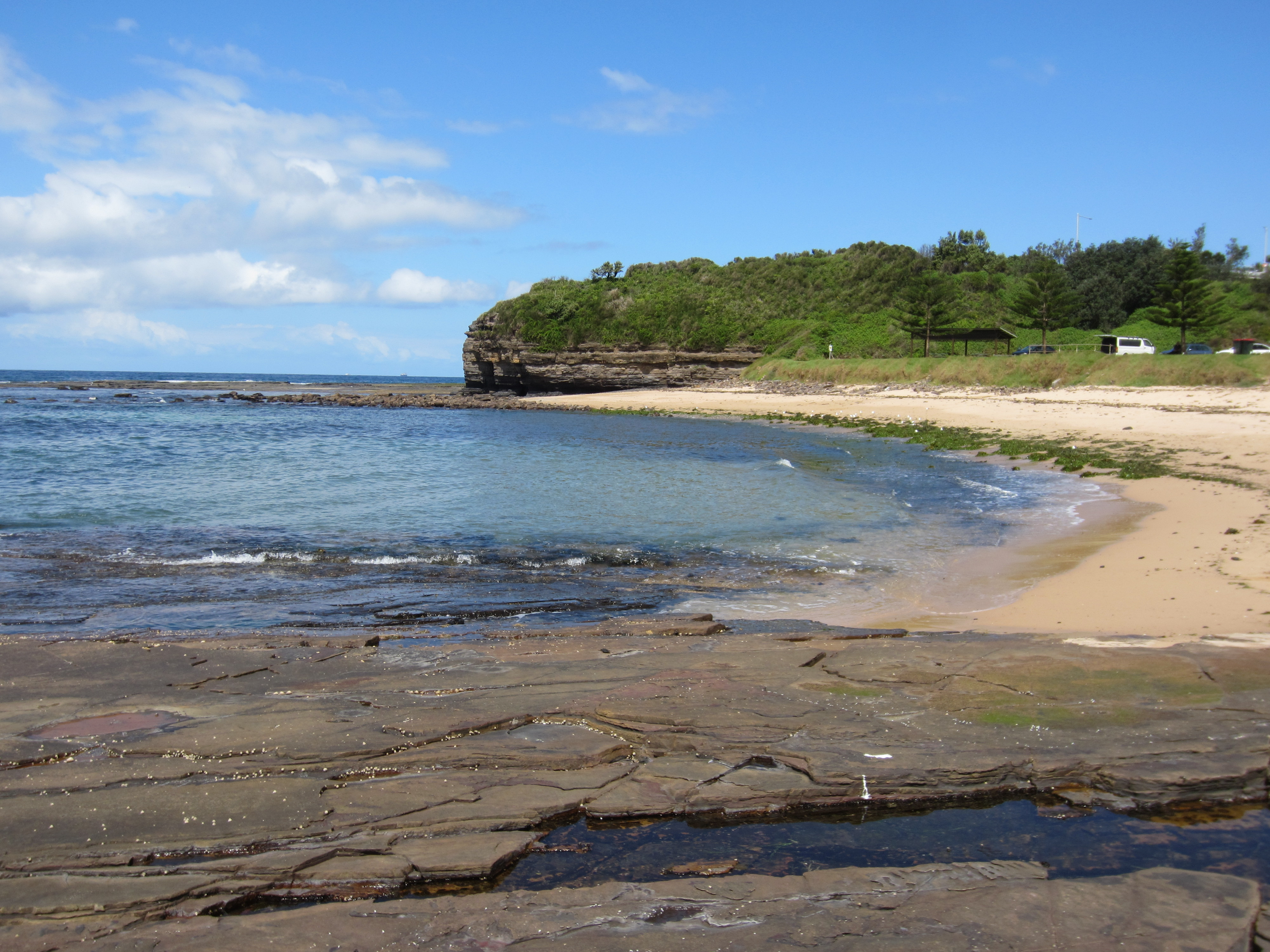
Commonly called a 'rock platform' in Australia, these two examples at Austinmer, N.S.W, are typical of many on the coast of south-eastern Australia.

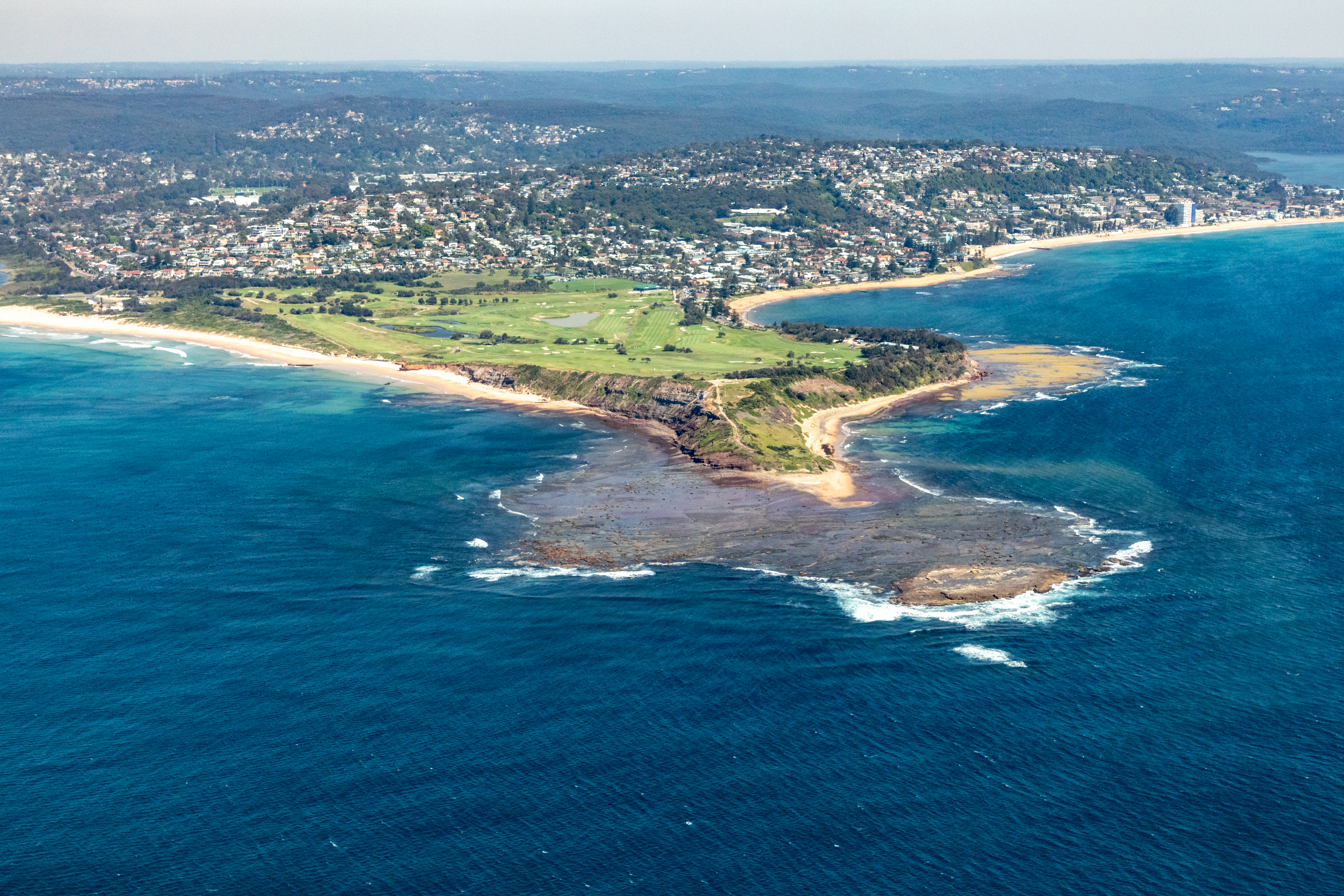
The rock platform at Long Reef, N.S.W., Australia.

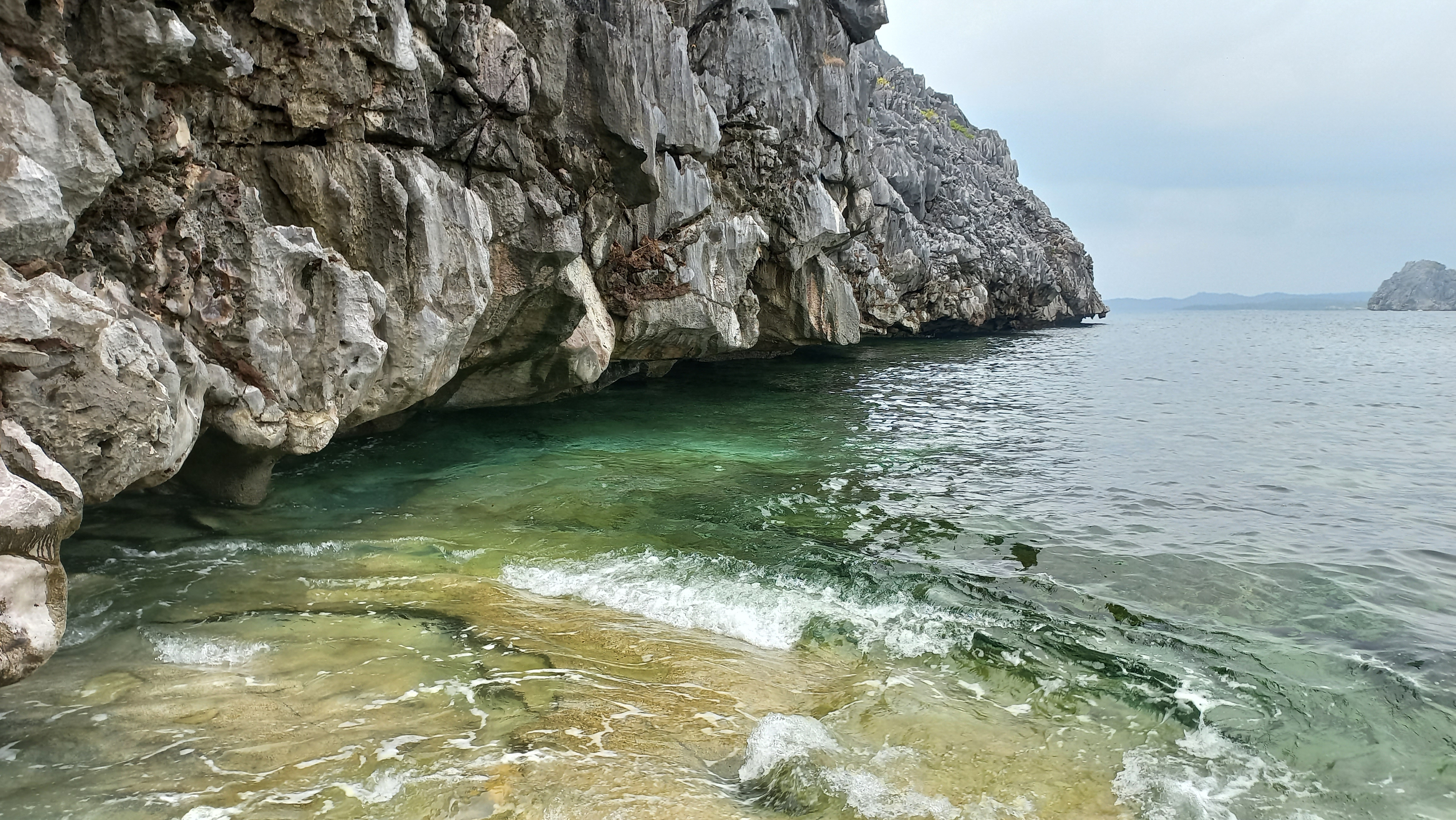
Wave-cut notch and submerged platform in Elet Island, Busuanga, Palawan, Philippines

== See also ==
- Beach
- Bench (geology)
- Machair
- Marine terrace
- Paleoshoreline
- Raised beach
- Raised shorelines
- Strandflat
- Terrace (geology)
