= Bilal U. Haq =

Pakistani-American geoscientist and poet

Bilal Haq
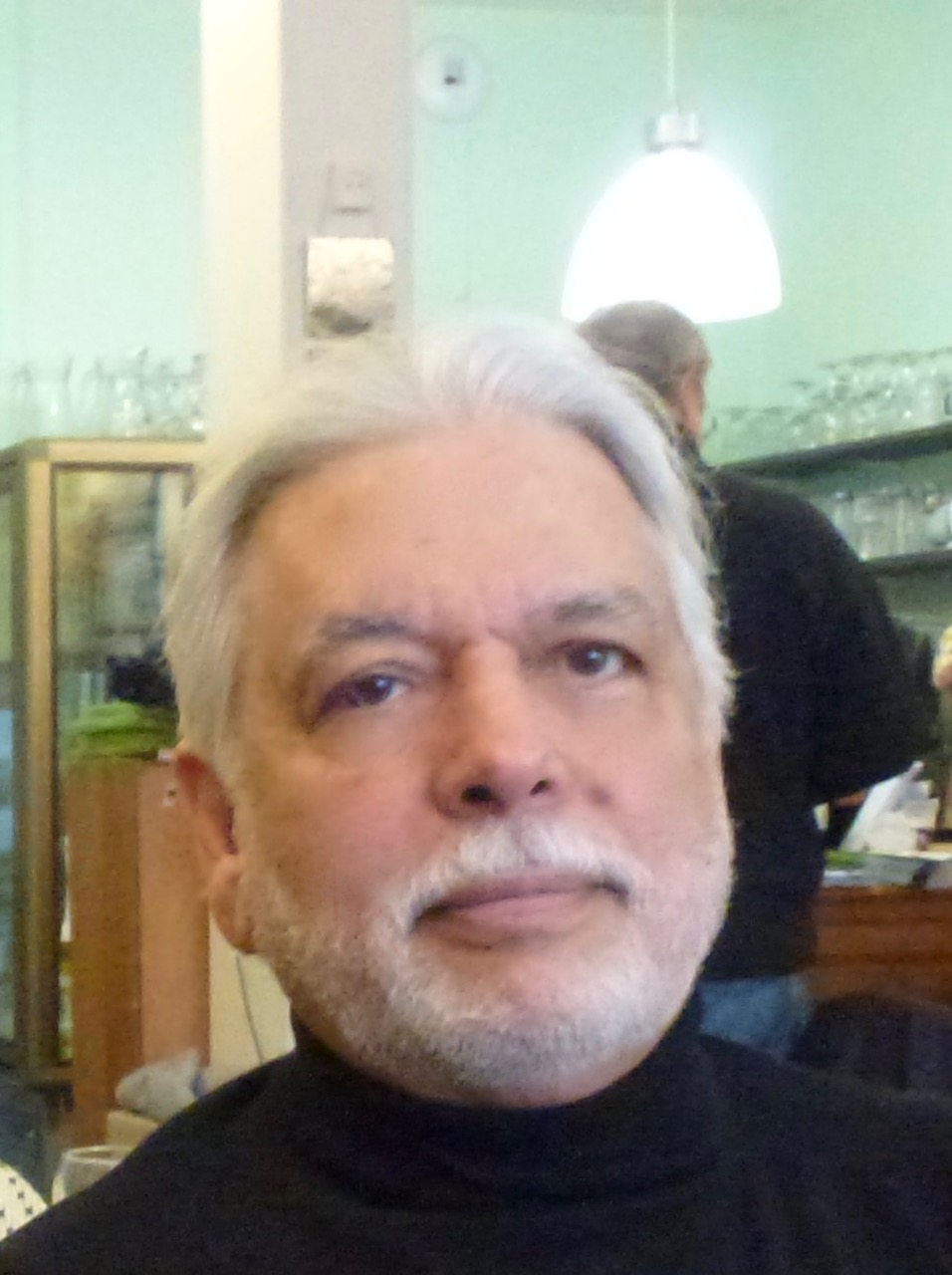
- Born: Bilal Ul Haq; 8 October 1948 (age 77)
- Education: University of the Punjab (MSc); Stockholm University (PhD, DSc)
- Awards: Awarded International Distinguished Career award by Geological Society of America (2024); Awarded Prestwich Prize (2019); Elected to Academia Europaea (European Academy of Science and Letters) (2015); Conferred Docteur honoris causa by Sorbonne University (2013); Awarded AGU Ocean Sciences Award (2004); Awarded US NSF Antarctic Medal (1999); Elected Fellow AAAS (1999); Awarded Shepard Medal for excellence in marine geology (1998); Elected Fellow GSA (1976)
- Scientific career
- Fields: Marine Geology; Marine sedimentology; Paleoceanography; Paleoclimatology; Paleobiogeography; Seismic stratigraphy; Sequence stratigraphy; Natural gas hydrates; Basin analysis; Hydrocarbon play evaluation
- Workplaces: Sorbonne University; Smithsonian Institution; Utrecht University; US National Science Foundation; Exxon Production Research Labs; Woods Hole Oceanographic Institution; Massachusetts Institute of Technology (MIT); Stockholm University; University of Vienna; [[University of the; Punjab]]
- Thesis: Paleogene Calcareous Nannoflora: Rates of Evolution in Cenozoic Calcareous Nannoplankton (1972)
- Doctoral advisor: Ivar Hessland
- Website: www.terradynamicsinternational.com

Bilal U. Haq is a Pakistani-American geoscientist (and poet) who is currently affiliated with and divides his time between the George Mason University in Washington, DC, and Sorbonne University's Institute of Earth Sciences in Paris, France. He is best known for his work on the Phanerozoic sea-level fluctuations and eustatic curves that are widely used in the academia and industry as the basis for global stratigraphy and in exploration geology. He is a laureate of the Prestwich Prize for geosciences from France.

== Early life and education ==
Bilal Haq was born in the foothills of Himalayas (Gorakhpur) where his father Mohammad Fazl-i-Haq was a senior ICS officer in the British Indian government. After the independence of India, his father opted to serve in the new nation of Pakistan since his family originated from Lahore, now in Pakistan. He received his early education at St. Paul's and Central Model Schools in Karachi and Lahore, respectively. In Lahore, he also earned his Bachelor and Master of Science degrees from the Government College and the Punjab University. In Europe, after receiving a diploma in German language from Dolmetscher Institut of Heidelberg University, he started his graduate research at the University of Vienna and then moved to Sweden to earn his PhD and DSc degrees in marine geoscience from the University of Stockholm.

== Career ==
Bilal U. Haq's career spans over five decades, and he has carried out research in several disciplines of marine geosciences at the University of Stockholm, the Woods Hole Oceanographic Institution in Massachusetts, Exxon Production Research Company in Houston, the National Science Foundation in Washington, DC, the Universities of Copenhagen, Cambridge, Oxford, Paris (UPMC, Sorbonne) and Utrecht. He has consulted with, provided advice to, or delivered specialized courses to numerous multinational resource companies, and geological surveys around the world through his consulting partnership.

He was seconded to the World Bank in Washington, DC in their Environment Department, where already in 1994 he produced a special report on the effects of climate change and sea-level rise on the economies of developing maritime nations.

In 1994, Bilal was also seconded by NSF to the White House's Executive Office of the US president for the Federal Budget where he worked on the science budget for independent science agencies. Bilal was appointed an honorary professor at both Tongji University in Shanghai and the Academia Sinica Institute of Ocean Sciences in Qingdao, China, and was a visiting professor at both Oxford and Cambridge Universities in the UK.

Bilal Haq is also a poet who has published four volumes of poetry, with insights into nature and the nature of man. His poetic license, enabled by his scientific background, has been fondly dubbed by his peers as "geopoetry", and his poetic message is that we have to learn to live with nature, if we are to survive.

Among Bilal's many services to the scientific community was his rescue of a prolific fossil site in the Shandong province of China (Confucius' birthplace) through an international appeal, (now a National Geopark). He also conceived and helped create a paleontological Geopark (together with the Chinese biologist and academician, Zheng Shouyi) consisting of giant sculptures based on fossil micro-organisms (Foraminifera) in Zhongshan City in Guangdong Province. Since its opening in December 2009, the sculpture park has been visited by over 200,000 visitors every year, which the Smithsonian magazine declared the second most important "Evo-tourism" site in the world. This was followed by another, larger, Foraminiferal sculpture park in the city of Qingdao, that was established in 2017.

== Research ==
Bilal Haq's research covers a broad spectrum of geosciences, from marine geology to marine sedimentology, paleoceanography, paleoclimatology, paleobiogeography, biostratigraphy, seismic, sequence and global stratigraphy, and natural gas hydrates. In the past his focus was on documenting sea-level changes along the world's continental margins and interior basins for the last 550 million years of Earth history (the complete Phanerozoic Eon). More recently he has directed his attention to influence of tectonics on the sedimentary record. He has also focused on quantifying the amount of total Messinian salt sequestered in the deep Mediterranean evaporite giant and its implications for tectonics in various deep basins and continental margins and the paleoceanography of this enclosed Sea. Bilal has published over 170 research papers, book chapters and encyclopedia articles, several of them among the most highly cited in Earth sciences, of which one was chosen as among the top 100 papers in geosciences of all time. His most recent publication is a popular science book entitled: Restless Tides of Time – Sea-Level Change: Past, Present and Prescient published by Springer-Nature (https://doi.org/10.1007/978-3-032-10292-8).

== Awards and honours ==
Bilal Haq's honors include the Shepard Medal for excellence in marine geology, the Ocean Sciences Award from the American Geophysical Union, the Antarctic Medal of the US National Science Foundation, and the Prestwich Prize from the Geological Society of France. The Geological Society of America recently recognized his contributions to geosciences with their International Distinguished Career Award. He has also been recognized for his research by the award of a doctoris honoris causa by the Sorbonne University, election to the membership of the European Academy of Science and Letters (Academia Europaea), and to fellowships of the American Association for the Advancement of Science and the Geological Society of America. Bilal has also been honored by his peers with the naming of a fossil plankton species and a genus after him. His international appeal saved a prolific fossil site from destruction (that was later declared a National Geopark) in Shandong Province in China and he helped create two Foraminiferal sculpture parks in Guangzhou and Qingdao.

== Poetry ==
Bilal Haq has published four volumes of poetry: Reflections (2016), Musings (2017), Ruminations (2017) and Glimpses of Nature and Man (2018). His selected poetry has so far been translated into Dutch, German, Mandarin (Chinese), and Swedish, presented along with the original English, and available on Barnes and Noble website.

== See also ==
- Sea-level curve
