= Peter Vail =

American geologist (1930–2024)

Peter R. Vail (January 13, 1930 – December 28, 2024) was an American geologist and geophysicist, the namesake of the Vail curve of sea level changes. Vail earned his AB at Dartmouth College in 1952, followed by M.S. and Ph.D. degrees from Northwestern University in 1956. He was the W. Maurice Ewing Professor, Emeritus, in the Department of Earth Science at Rice University.

Vail was well known for being the first to realize that seismic reflections do not follow lithofacies boundaries but instead follow geologic time lines. This concept gave rise to the field of seismic stratigraphy.

In 2005 he earned the Benjamin Franklin Medal for his pioneering works in sequence stratigraphy. His other honors include the Legendary Geoscientist Award from the American Geological Institute, the Penrose Medal from the Geological Society of America in 2003, the Sidney Powers Memorial Award, and the Distinguished Educator Award from the American Association of Petroleum Geologists. Vail died on December 28, 2024, at the age of 94.
