= Accommodation (geology) =

Space available for deposition of sediments

Accommodation in geology is the space that is available for the deposition of sediments. A fundamental concept in sequence stratigraphy, accommodation can be construed as the volume between the actual surface and the theoretical equilibrium surface where deposition and erosion are in balance at every point. In marine environments, this equilibrium level is sea level.

In marine environments, changes in accommodation on long temporal scales are mainly determined by tectonics or by changes in eustatic sea level. In fluvial environments, changes in accommodation are controlled by the gradient, discharge and sediment supply. In the lower parts of river systems, the change of accommodation in the fluvial system is controlled by the changes in marine accommodation.

The term is also sometimes used to describe processes by which room is made for plutons to intrude country rock.
