= Fossil beach =

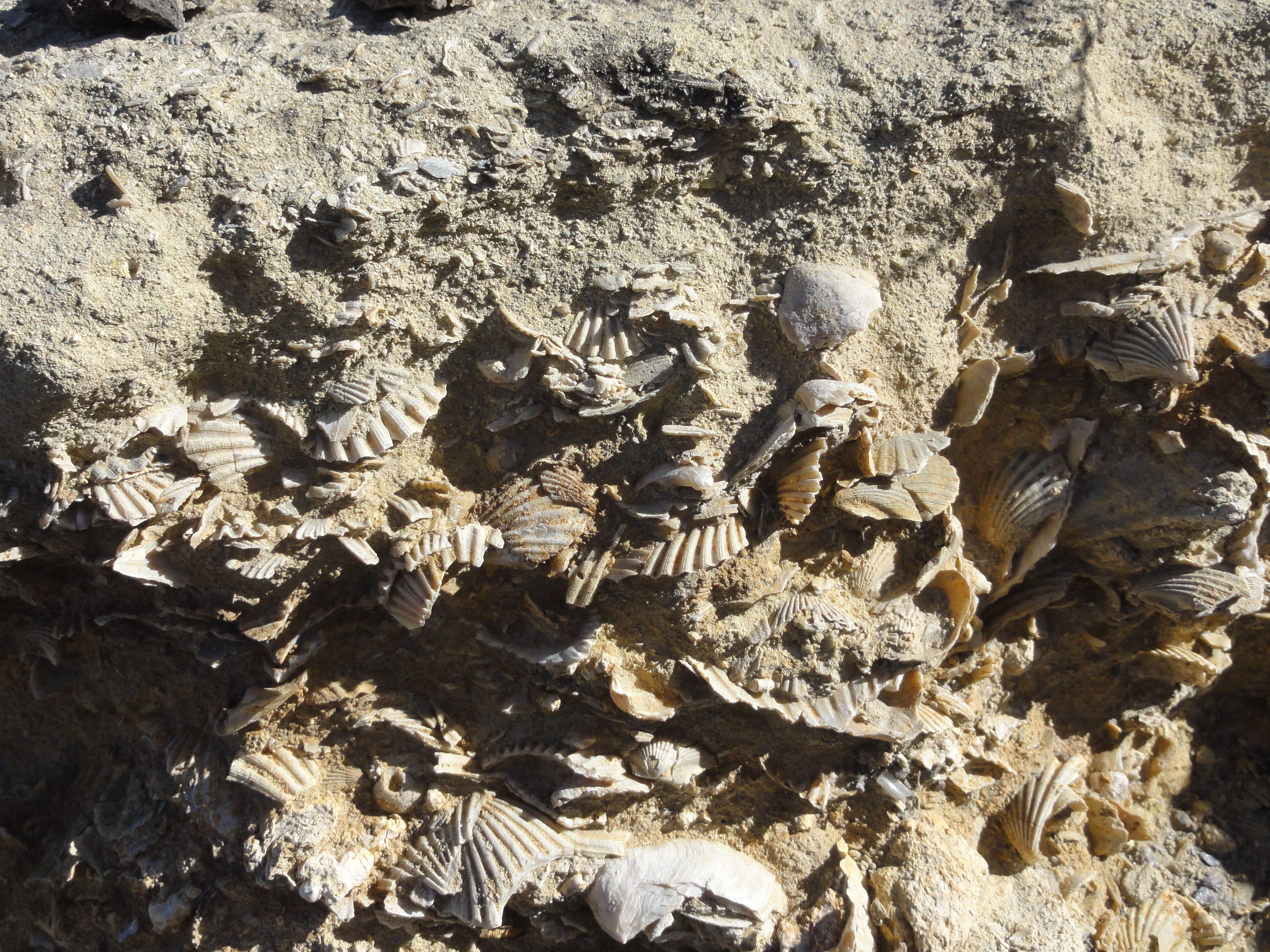
Fossil beach sediments characterized by the abundance of seashell fossils, in the south of Spain.

A fossil beach, also known as a paleo-beach, fossil strandline or raised beach, is an ancient oceanic or lacustrine beach preserved in fossil form due to a change in water level or sea level, or because of a shift in terrain elevation. It is often present as a sediment layer or terrace, with beach-related fossils and features, above the present shoreline.

== Causes ==
Emerged shorelines relative to the sea level are created because of three main causes: tectonic movements that result in changes in terrain elevation, isostatic lifting and warping due to unloading of ice sheets and sea water masses during deglaciation, and eustatic drops of sea levels during glaciations. The effects produced by these three causes are often superposed, which complexifies the interpretation of ancient shorelines, and the evaluation of former sea levels during the Quaternary.

== Location and research ==
In the United States, fossil beaches may be discovered where a limestone quarry or strip mining operation is present. For example, Miami has numerous fossil beaches which have been exposed by limestone mining. A famous example is the Pinecrest beds — a fossil-bearing rock formation found in the south of the city which is a segment of a much larger geological formation — the Tamiami Formation. The Isle of Portland, famous for Portland stone also has several examples around its coast.

The search for fossil beaches worldwide is particularly important when scientists try to determine the position of former shorelines, which could help to understand how much sea levels could rise in a warmer world, specially in the context of global climate change.
