= Bench (geology) =

Long, relatively narrow land bounded by distinctly steeper slopes above and below

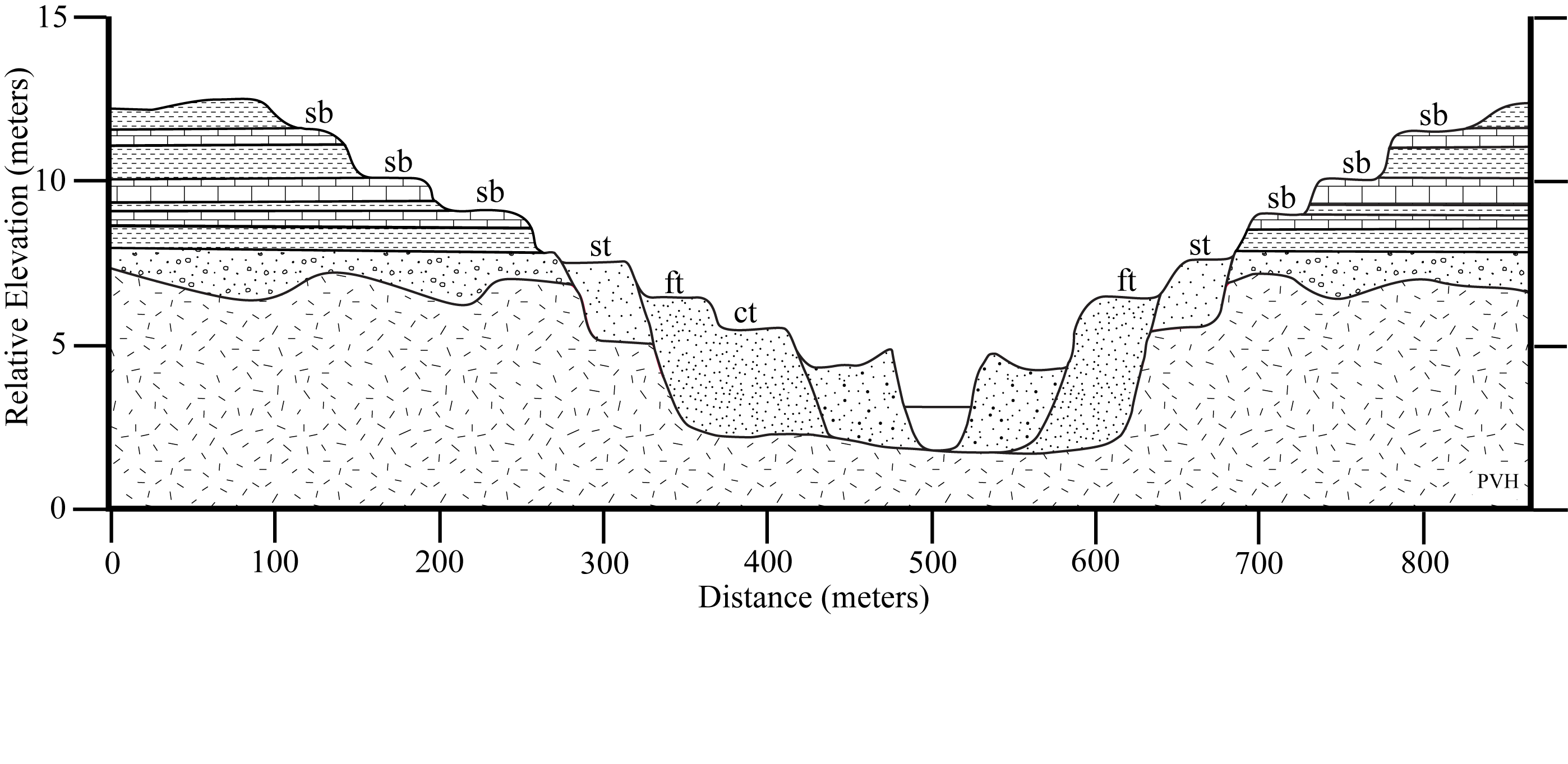
Hypothetical cross-section of a river valley showing different types of benches. They include structural benches (sb) formed by the differential erosion of shale beds overlying limestone beds. Also, they include benches in the form of narrow strath terraces (st), fill terraces (ft), and cut terraces (ct) underlain by fluvial sediments.

In geomorphology, geography and geology, a bench or benchland is a long, relatively narrow strip of relatively level or gently inclined land bounded by distinctly steeper slopes above and below it. Benches can be of different origins and created by very different geomorphic processes.

First, the differential erosion of rocks or sediments of varying hardness and resistance to erosion can create benches. Earth scientists called such benches "structural benches." Second, other benches are narrow fluvial terraces created by the abandonment of a floodplain by a river or stream and entrenchment of the river valley into it. Finally, a bench is also the name of a narrow flat area often seen at the base of a sea cliff created by waves or other physical or chemical erosion near the shoreline. These benches are typically referred to as either "coastal benches," "wave-cut benches," or "wave-cut platforms."

In mining, a bench is a narrow, strip of land cut into the side of an open-pit mine. These step-like zones are created along the walls of an open-pit mine for access and mining.

== See also ==
- Raised beach, also known as Marine terrace – Emergent coastal landform
- Piedmonttreppen
- Strandflat – Type of landform found in high-latitude areas
- Terrace (geology) – A step-like landform
