= Schistes et Grès Carteret =

The Schistes et Grès Carteret are a series of phosphatic and glauconitic Tommotian siliciclastics exposed in Normandy, France.

They overlie Precambrian conglomerates and are overlain by the Calcaires de Laize.
