= Terrace (geology) =

Step-like landform

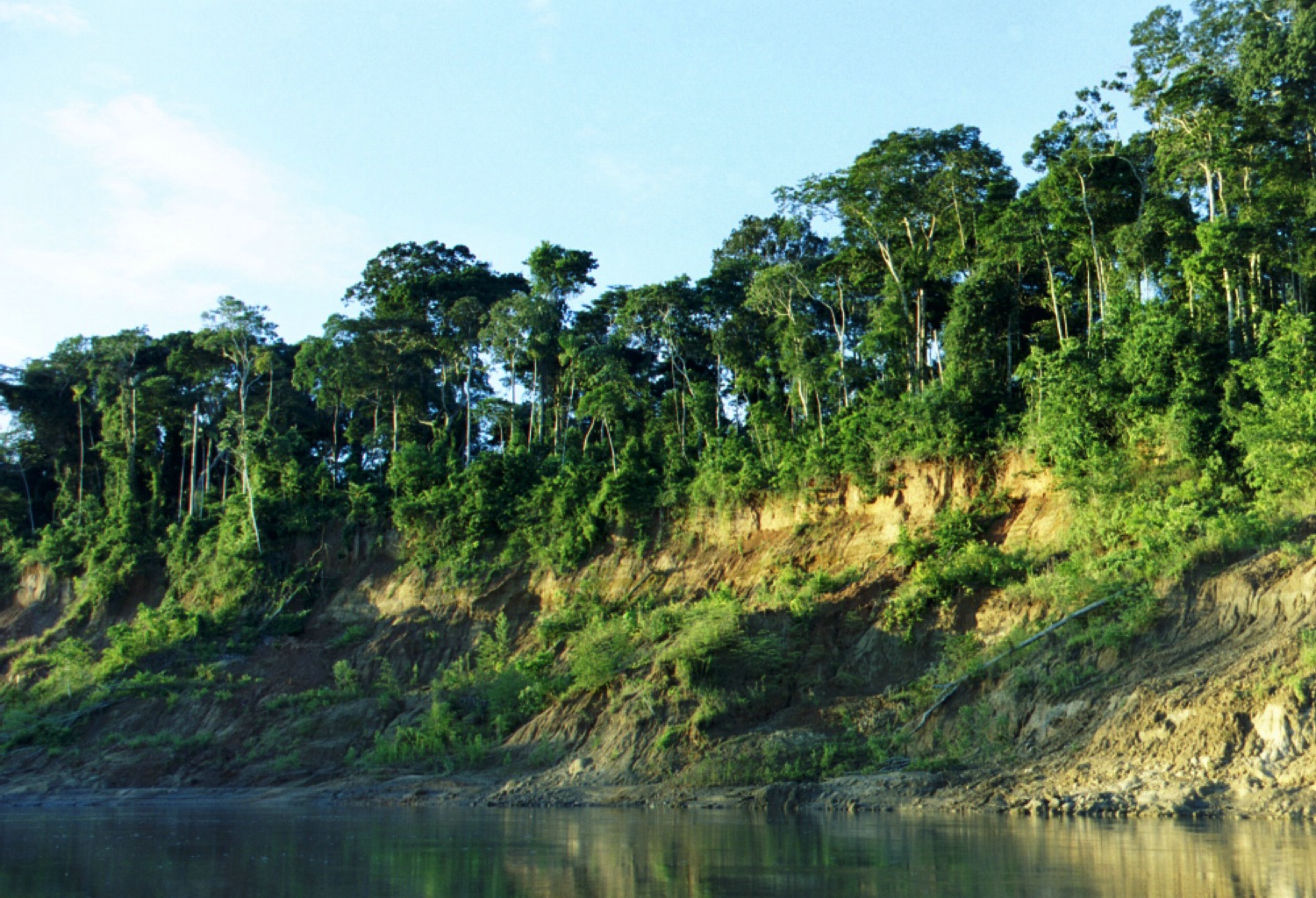
Sediments underlying fluvial terrace exposed in cutbanks along the Manú River, Peru

In geology, a terrace is a step-like landform. A terrace consists of a flat or gently sloping geomorphic surface, called a tread, that is typically bounded on one side by a steeper ascending slope, which is called a "riser" or "scarp". The tread and the steeper descending slope (riser or scarp) together constitute the terrace. Terraces can also consist of a tread bounded on all sides by a descending riser or scarp. A narrow terrace is often called a bench.

The sediments underlying the tread and riser of a terrace are also commonly, but incorrectly, called terraces, leading to confusion.

Terraces are formed in various ways.

== Fluvial terraces ==
Fluvial terraces are remnants of the former floodplain of a stream or river. They are formed by the downcutting of a river or stream channel into and the abandonment and lateral erosion of its former floodplain. The downcutting, abandonment, and lateral erosion of a former floodplain can be the result of either changes in sea level, local or regional tectonic uplift; changes in local or regional climate; changes in the amount of sediment being carried by the river or stream; change in discharge of the river; or a complex mixture of these and other factors. The most common sources of the variations in rivers and streams that create fluvial terraces are vegetative, geomorphic, and hydrologic responses to climate. More recently, the direct modification of rivers and streams and their watersheds by cultural processes have resulted in the development of terraces along many rivers and streams.

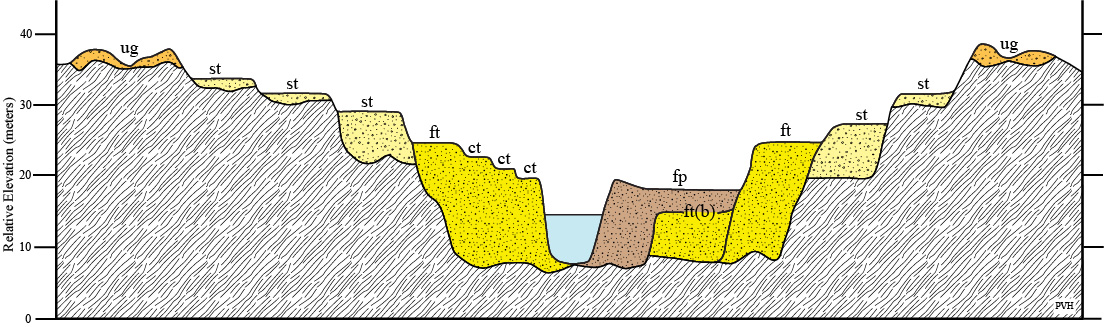
Hypothetical valley cross-section illustrating a complex sequence of aggradational (fill) and degradational (cut and strath) terraces and deposits (upland gravels). Note ct = cut terraces, ft = fill terraces, ft(b) = buried fill terrace, fp = active floodplain, st = strath terrace, and ug = upland gravels.

== Kame terraces ==
Kame terraces are formed on the side of a glacial valley and are the deposits of meltwater streams flowing between the ice and the adjacent valley side.

== Marine terraces ==
A marine terrace represents the former shoreline of a sea or ocean. It can be formed by marine abrasion or erosion of materials comprising the shoreline (marine-cut terraces or wave-cut platforms); the accumulations of sediments in the shallow-water to slightly emerged coastal environments (marine-built terraces or raised beach); or the bioconstruction by coral reefs and accumulation of reef materials (reef flats) in intertropical regions.

The formation of a marine terrace follows this general process: A wave cut platform must be carved into bedrock (high wave energy is needed for this process). Although this is the first step to the process for the formation of a marine terrace, not all wave cut platforms will become a marine terrace. After the wave cut platform is formed it must be removed from interaction with the high wave energy. This process happens by either change in sea level due to glacial-interglacial cycles or tectonically rising landmasses. When the wave cut has been raised above sea level it is preserved. The terraces are most commonly preserved in flights along the coastline.

== Lacustrine terraces ==
A lake (lacustrine) terrace represents the former shoreline of either a nonglacial, glacial, or proglacial lake. As with marine terraces, a lake terrace can be formed by either the abrasion or erosion of materials comprising the shoreline, the accumulations of sediments in the shallow-water to slightly emerged environments, or some combination of these. Given the smaller size of lakes relative to the size of typical marine water bodies, lake terraces are overall significantly narrower and less well developed than marine terraces. However, not all lake terraces are relict shorelines. In case of the lake terraces of ancient ice-walled lakes, some proglacial lakes, and alluvium-dammed (slackwater) lakes, they often represent the relict bottom of these lakes. Finally, glaciolacustrine kame terraces are either the relict deltas or bottoms of ancient ice marginal lakes.

== Structural terraces ==
In geomorphology, a structural terrace is a terrace created by the differential erosion of flat-lying or nearly flat-lying layered strata. The terrace results from preferential stripping by erosion of a layer of softer strata from an underlying layer of harder strata. The preferential removal of softer material exposes the flat surface of the underlying harder layer, creating the tread of a structural terrace. Structural terraces are commonly paired and not always associated with river valleys.

== Travertine terraces ==
A travertine terrace is formed when geothermally heated supersaturated alkaline waters emerge to the surface and form waterfalls of precipitated carbonates.

== Terracettes ==
Terracettes are small, regular terraces formed on hillsides, thought to be caused by animal trampling, vegetation and regolith behaviour, soil creep or solifluction.

== See also ==
- Parallel Roads of Glen Roy – Nature reserve in the Highlands of Scotland with ancient shoreline terraces
- Machair – Fertile low-lying grassy plain
- Piedmonttreppen
- Raised beach – Emergent coastal landform
- Raised shoreline – Ancient shoreline exposed above current water level
- Terrace (earthworks) – Terrain formed by tiered platforms
- Wave-cut platform – Narrow flat area created by erosion
