= Paleoshoreline =

Shoreline which existed in the geologic past

A paleoshoreline (ancient shoreline) is a shoreline that existed in the geologic past. (Paleo is from an ancient Greek word meaning "old" or "ancient".) Paleoshorelines are driven by changes in sea level over geological time. "Sea level" refers to the average level of a marine water body over a relatively long period of time (years). Fluctuations in sea level is largely due to the melting and freezing of ice sheets. The position of paleoshorelines differed greatly from modern shorelines and can be used to reconstruct past sea levels, environments and ecological communities. Paleoshorelines exist due to unique preservation processes and give insight into the formation and understanding of prominent marine structures. Lakes may also have paleoshorelines. The reconstruction of paleoshorelines also aid in the understanding of species migration, modern ecological assemblages, and paleoclimates.

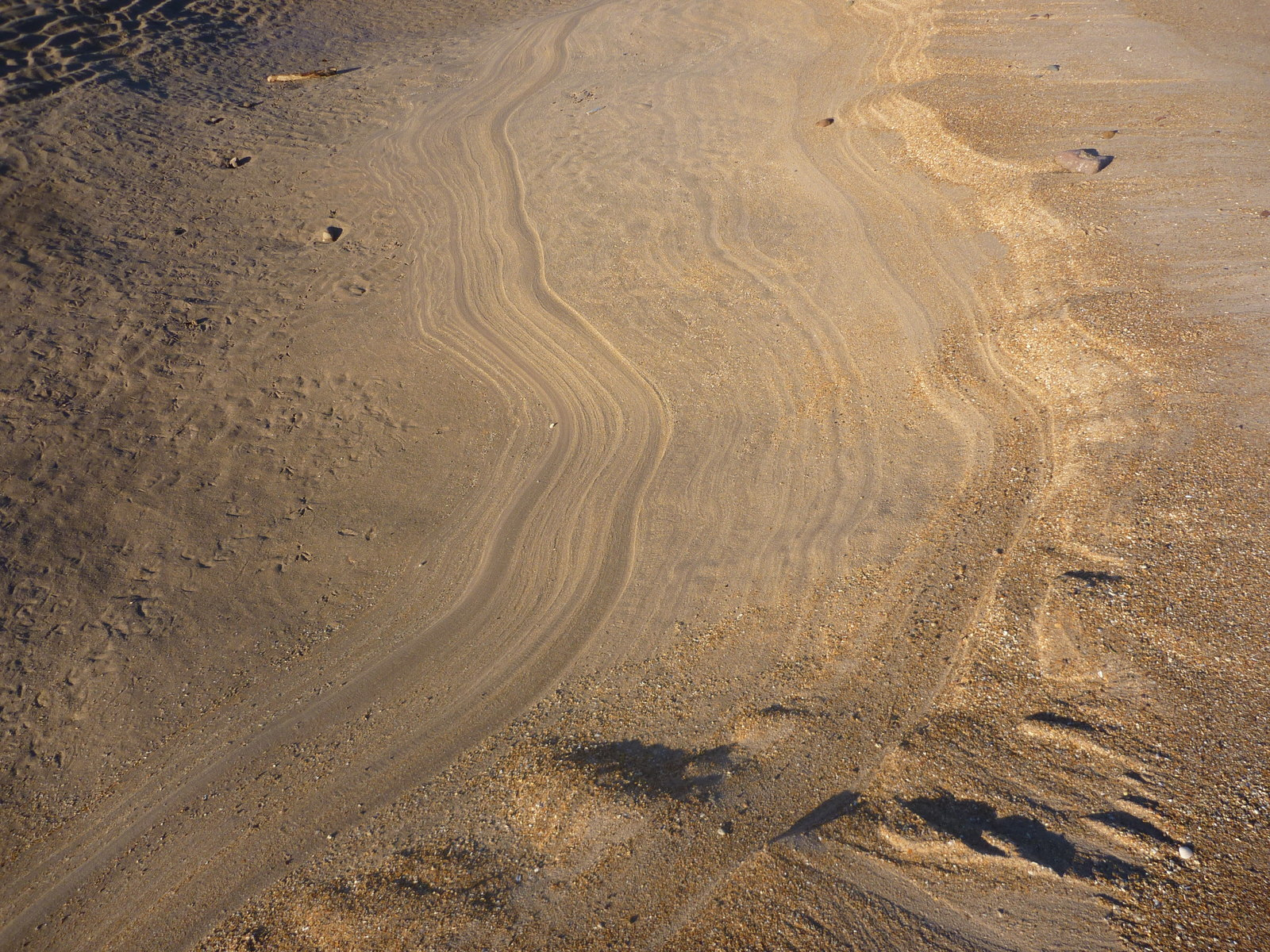
Paleoshoreline

Average sea level can advance and recede over much longer periods (thousands or millions of years), causing paleoshorelines which may be difficult to identify, but are often found in long lasting coastal structures such as beaches, sand dunes, and coral reefs. Tides cause the ocean to advance and recede in a very short time scale, in most places about twice per day. Weather conditions can also cause short-term variations. Coastlines can also move by coastal erosion without a change in sea level. A perched coastline is an ancient (fossil) shoreline positioned above the present shoreline.

Just off the coast of parts of North America, in the last 21,000 years, sea level has varied from over 130 meters (430 ft) below present level to over 130 meters (430 ft) above present level. Within those 21,000 years, humans have lived in North America the entire time. In regions where the continental shelf has a low relief, the paleoshoreline could be over 100 miles from the modern coastline.

== Formation ==
Paleoshorelines can be reconstructed and inferred by geological structures that were once exposed before sea levels rose. Over geological time, fluctuations in sea level has been primarily driven through the melting and freezing of ice sheets and plate tectonics. Melting of ice sheets increases the volume of water within the ocean, ultimately causing ice sheets to retreat and sea levels to rise. Thermal expansion of water is an additional mechanism leading to volumetric sea level rise. Thermal expansion explains the phenomena of changing volumes of water when it is heated or cooled. The shifting of plate tectonics also contributes to fluctuations in sea level rise by changing the shape of ocean basins.

Sediment type and time of formation, determine the ability of paleoshorelines to be preserved and identified in marine deposits. These factors aid in the understanding of how paleoshorelines have been able to withstand fluctuations in sea level throughout geological time. The calcium carbonate used in the shells of many marine invertebrates such as corals, mussels, and clams acts as an important building material that helps with the preservation of paleoshorelines, as they are more resistant to erosion and can maintain their structure through changing sea levels over geologic time.

A lake may also have a paleoshoreline.

Paleoshorelines have also been inferred on Mars; see Burgsvik Beds and Martian dichotomy.

Paleoshorelines illustrated: Beringia sea levels (blues) and land elevations (browns) measured in metres from 21,000 years ago to present

== Scientific importance ==
Paleoshorelines capture valuable records of environmental change and can tell us about modern shelf ecosystems. These structures can indicate distributions of seabed features that are habitats of marine life; they may also reveal the location of coastal resources once used by humans, of archaeological significance.

== Examples ==
- The Bering Land Bridge once stood above water, and is the most commonly evoked migration route for the first peoples in the Americas from Asia. Throughout the Pleistocene, the land bridge has been exposed during glaciations, and has been inundated since about 11,000-13,000 YBP. The Bering Land Bridge is a paleoshoreline that acted as a migration route for humans, animals, and plants that is now submerged due to rising sea levels. Underwater archeology is being used to study the human migration along the Bering Land Bridge.
- Once Doggerland, an area of the North Sea, was once exposed above water, connecting Great Britain to the rest of Europe.
- In a sudden event, the 1700 Cascadia earthquake caused the coastline of what are now British Columbia, Washington, Oregon and north California to "drop several feet".
- In Asia, the Yonaguni Monument, a submerged rock formation near the Ryukyu Islands, once stood above sea level; whether the formations are human-made is still argued.

== See also ==
- List of ancient oceans
- List of prehistoric lakes
- Palaeochannel
- Perched coastline
- Raised beach

== External links and references ==
- Paleoshoreline research
- Paleoshorelines of Florida, USA
- Submerged Shorelines in the Southern California Borderland
- Paleoshorelines of Mono Lake, California, USA
