= Raised shoreline =

Ancient shoreline exposed above current water level

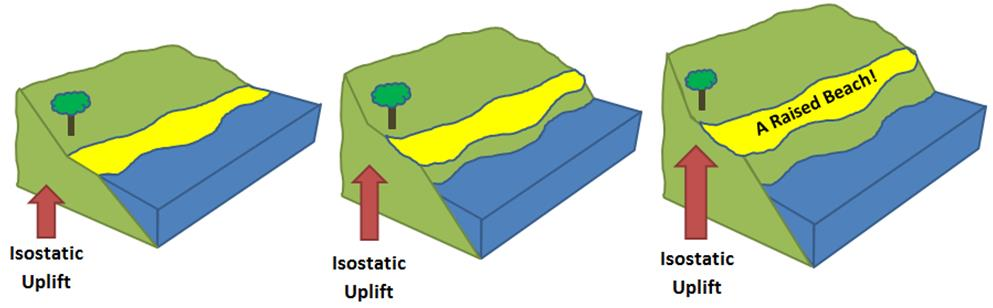

A raised shoreline is an ancient shoreline exposed above current water level. These landforms are formed by a relative change in sea level due to global sea level rise, isostatic rebound, and/or tectonic uplift. These surfaces are usually exposed above modern sea level when a heavily glaciated area experiences a glacial retreat, causing water levels to rise. This area will then experience post-glacial rebound, effectively raising the shoreline surface.

Examples of raised shorelines can be found along the coasts of formerly glaciated areas in Ireland and Scotland, as well as in North America. Raised shorelines are exposed at various locations around the Puget Sound of Washington State.

== See also ==
- Isostasy
- Landform
- Machair
- Marine terrace
- Parallel Roads of Glen Roy
- Raised beach
- Terrace (geology)
- Wave-cut platform
