= Eustatic sea level =

Distance from the center of Earth to the sea surface

The eustatic sea level (from Greek εὖ eû, "good" and στάσις stásis, "standing") is the distance from the center of Earth to the sea surface. An increase of the eustatic sea level can be generated by decreasing glaciation, increasing spreading rates of the mid-ocean ridges or increasing the number of mid-oceanic ridges. Conversely, increasing glaciation, decreasing spreading rates or fewer mid-ocean ridges can lead to a fall in the eustatic sea level.

Changes in the eustatic sea level lead to changes in accommodation and therefore affect the deposition of sediments in marine environments.

Note that reports from IPCC (Intergovernmental Panel on Climate Change) do not use the term "eustatic" any more, but instead adopt the term "barystatic" to define global mean sea-level changes resulting from a change in the mass of the ocean.

== Overview ==
The eustatic (global) sea level is mean level determined by the mass and volume of all the Earth's oceans. This is not a physical level but instead represents the sea level if all of the water in the oceans were contained in a single basin. Eustatic sea level is not relative to local surfaces, because relative sea level depends on many factors – including tectonics, continental rise, temperature and subsidence. Eustatic sea level follows the "bathtub approach" which describes the ocean as a single bathtub. One can add or remove water and Earth's oceans will gain or lose water globally. Differences in eustatic sea level over time stem from three main factors:

- Changes in total ocean water mass, for instance, by ice-sheet runoff. When an ice sheet (such as Greenland) begins to lose some of its ice mass due to melt, the liquid water is transported to the ocean. According to the "bathtub approach", ice-sheet runoff from Greenland will affect eustatic sea level in all areas of the world, whether nearby or distant. Ocean water mass may shrink in size if the continental ice sheets grow in size, thereby removing liquid water from oceans and converting them to grow ice sheets
- Changes in the size of the ocean basin, for instance, by tectonic seafloor spreading or by sedimentation. These slow processes can cause the total volume of the oceanic basin to change.
- Density changes of the water, for instance, by thermal expansion. Warming will cause water to experience greater molecular motion, thus increasing the volume a molecule will occupy. Expansion of water may also be caused by changes in ocean salinity. As continental ice accumulates, the ocean water freezes onto land but the salt it carried will mostly remain in the ocean. Thus, as ice sheets increase, ocean salinity also increases (and vice versa). An increase in salinity will increase the density of the ocean basin. Melting of ice sheets and a decrease of ocean salinity will effectively decrease the density of the water. These two effects together result in the steric sea level. The thermal part is called the thermosteric sea level, whereas the salinity part is called the halosteric sea level.

== See also ==
- Sea level rise
- Ocean
