= Delta Field (Niger Delta) =

Oil field in Nigeria

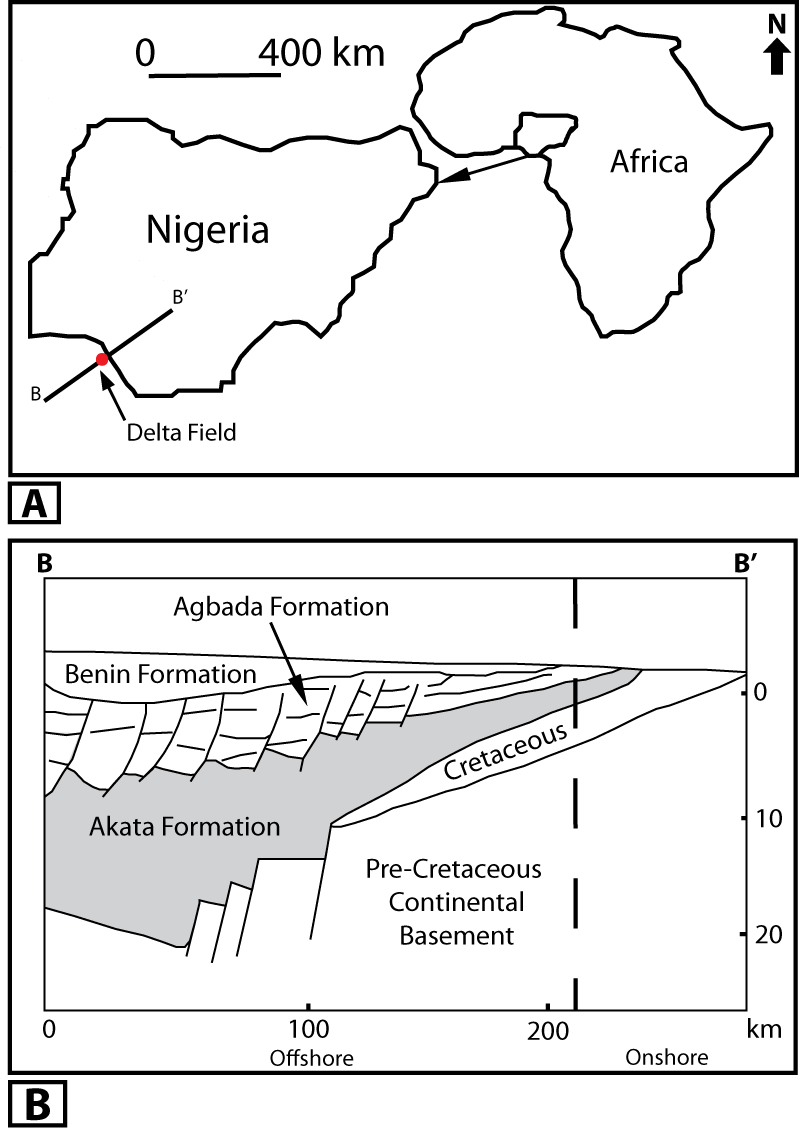
(A) Location of the Delta Field, which is located within the Niger Delta (B) Cross section across the Niger Delta, which is based on Stacher, 1995

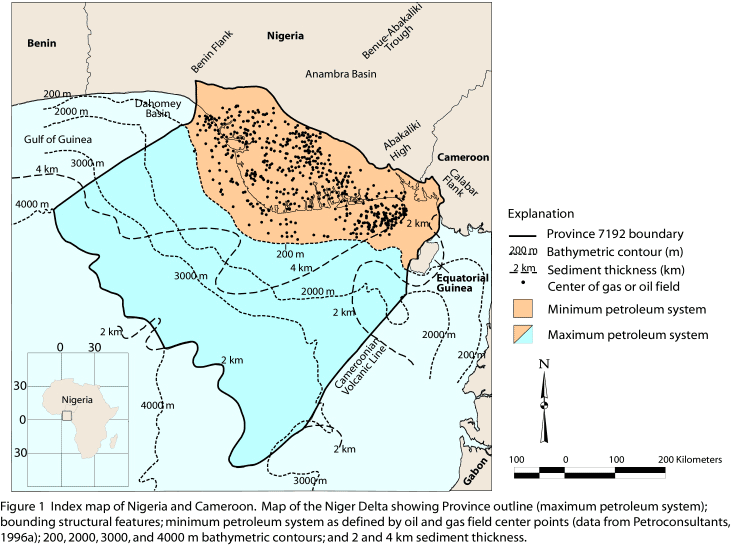
Location of the Niger Delta, which is located on the continental margin of the Gulf of Guinea in equatorial West Africa. Image from USGS Open-File Report 99-50-H

The Delta Field is located offshore from Nigeria on Oil Mining Leases (OML) 49 and 95. This is located within the Niger Delta Basin and sits in 12 feet of water. In 1965, the Delta 1 well was completed and the Delta Field opened in 1968 for production.

The Niger Delta is a wave-dominated delta located on the continental margin of the Gulf of Guinea that formed in the Paleogene. The delta is fed with sediment from the Niger River, which has the ninth largest drainage area in the world and the third largest in Africa at 2.23 million km^{2}. The delta is 75,000 km^{2} in size and reaches a maximum thickness of 12 km in the center of the basin. The Niger Delta is one of the world's major hydrocarbon provinces; specifically, it ranks 12th in terms of known accumulation of hydrocarbons with reserves exceeding 34 billion barrels of oil and 93 trillion cubic feet of gas. Oil and gas is predominantly extracted from the Agbada Formation and is targeted from structural traps there.

The Delta Field produces from the only identified petroleum system in the Niger Delta region, the Tertiary Niger Delta (Akata–Agbada) Petroleum System. Throughout the region, oil and gas is predominantly extracted from the Agbada Formation where it is targeted from structural traps.

== Geologic history and depositional processes ==
The Niger Delta Basin is an extensional rift basin where rifting occurred from the Late Jurassic to the Late Cretaceous. Cretaceous fracture zones, expressed as trenches and ridges, control the tectonic framework of the delta and separate the margin into individual sub-basins, which form the boundary faults of the Cretaceous Benue-Abakaliki trough. The Niger Delta Basin is the youngest and most southern sub-basin (located at the southwest boundary) in the Benue-Abakaliki trough. The Benue-Abakaliki trough represents a failed arm of a rift triple junction associated with the opening of the South Atlantic.

Key to understanding the Delta Field is the formation of the Niger Delta. Since the Eocene, the Niger Delta has been prograding to the southwest with sediment coming from the Niger River. As the delta progrades, growth-fault-bounded depobelts are created. These depobelts represent the most active portion of the delta at each stage of its development. They also represent a change in regional dip of the delta. Each depobelt is composed of genetically similar sediments that are diachronous. There are three main provinces of depobelts within the delta: the northern delta province, central delta province, and the distal delta province. The provinces are delineated based on structure. The Delta Field falls into the northern delta province, which has the oldest growth faults compared to the other provinces.

== Stratigraphy ==
The Cretaceous lithology of the Niger Delta Basin is only known due to the adjacent basin to the northeast, the Anambra Basin. There, the Cretaceous section is exposed and we get a glimpse into the stratigraphy. Lithology of the Niger Delta Basin above the Cretaceous is known from drilling and coring efforts within the basin.

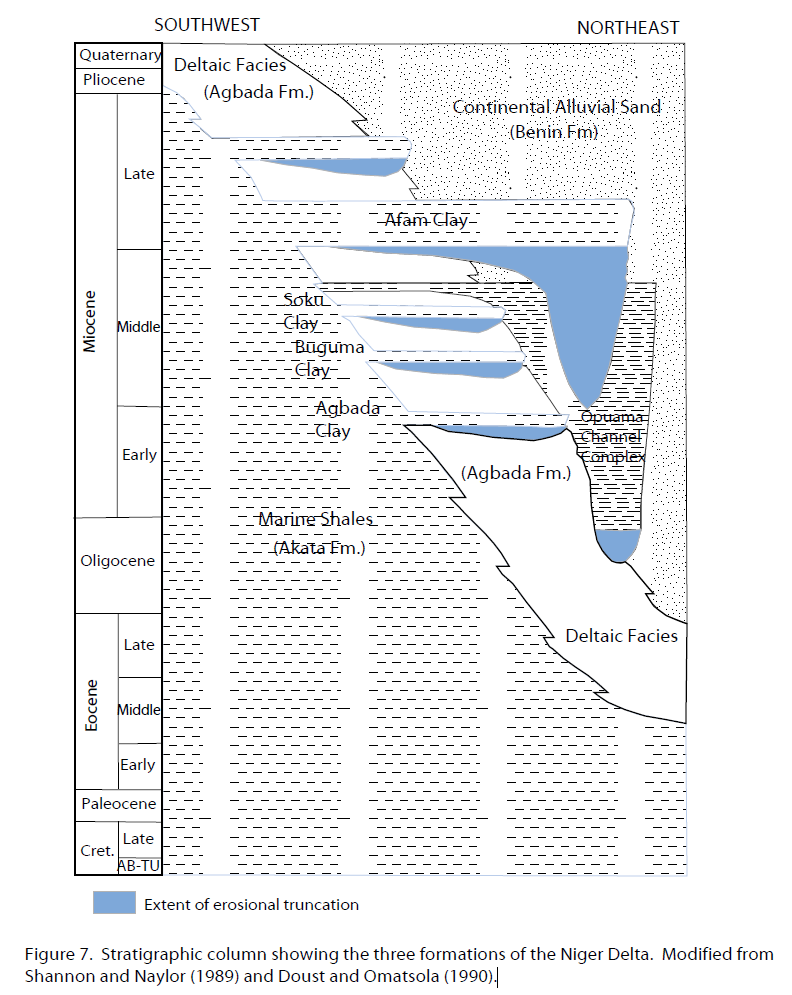
Stratigraphic column of the Niger Delta. Image from USGS Open-File Report 99-50-H (1999) and modified from Shannon and Naylor (1989) and Doust and Omatsola (1990).

Campanian through the Paleocene: concave coastline that produces tide-dominated deltaic sedimentation during transgressions and river-dominated sedimentation during regressions

Paleocene: major transgression event, which is when the Akata shale began being deposited.

Eocene: coastline switched from concave to convexly curvilinear, resulting in longshore drift causing wave-dominated sedimentation.

Cenozoic to Recent: prograding deltaic facies including the Akata, Agbada, and Benin Formation. Today, delta sedimentation is still wave-dominated.

Three large-scale lithostratigraphic units within the Tertiary have formed as the result of long-term progradation onto the Atlantic Ocean passive margin. They are distinguished from one another on the basis of their sand-to-shale ratios.

=== Akata Formation ===
The Akata Formation underlies the entire base of the delta. It is composed of marine pro-delta shales and turbidite sands that have been deposited since the Paleocene. Minor amounts of clay and silt are also present. Since the formation has not been drilled, it is only estimated that the formation is up to 7,000 meters thick.

=== Agbada Formation ===
The Agbada Formation, which overlies the Akata Formation, contains paralic siliciclastics and are considered to be the main deltaic sequence. The formation contains the most economically exploitable hydrocarbon in the region. According to biostratigraphy— specifically the presence of Sphenolitus heteromorphis, Praeorbulina glomerosa, Discoster deflandreim and Sphenolithus moriformis—the formation was deposited over 6-7 million years during the Middle to Late Miocene. In the Delta Field, gamma ray logs show a coarsening upward trend within the Agbada Formation, which shows the regression of depositional environments within the delta. In the Delta Field, the top of the Agbada Formation is at approximately 3000 feet below sea level, at the base of freshwater sands. The base of the formation is 8000 feet below sea level. The formation thickens basinwards towards the offshore depocenter.

=== Benin Formation ===
A fluvial and upper coastal plain facies that has been deposited since the Oligocene and, like the Akata and Agbada Formations, extends across the entire delta. The Benin Formation overlies the Agbada Formation, and consists of sands that are up to 2000 meters thick at some places in the delta.

== Structure ==
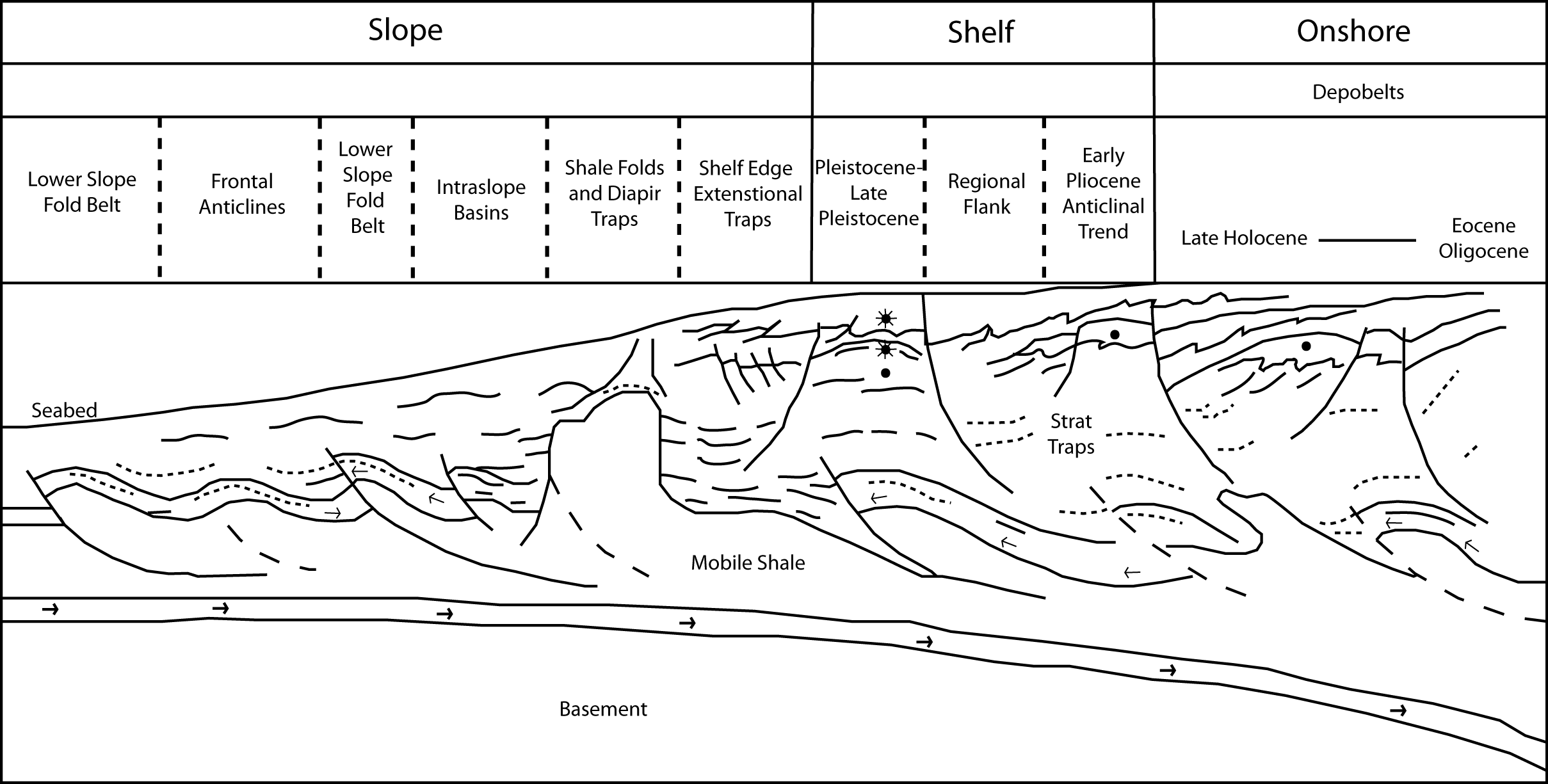
Schematic structural profile of the Niger Delta, which is characterized by listric extension faults, gentle folds thrusts, and diapirs. Image modified from Ojo, 1996.

The stratigraphy of the Niger Delta is complicated by clastic wedge syndepositional collapse that occurred as the result of marine shales being mobilized. When the delta was deposited, it was a prograding extensional complex with marine shales below. The extensional system contains large scale, basin-dipping normal growth faults that trend northeast to southwest and northwest to southeast. The growth faults in the northern delta province are mostly rotational, increase in steepness seaward, and are evenly spaced

Along with the growth faults, rollover anticlines, shale ridges, and shale diapirs exist in the basin and can be seen in the schematic structural profile of the Niger Delta.

The Delta Field is located on the dominantly extensional proximal margin of a major collapse structure. The general structure of the Delta Field has two main fault blocks that are separated from one another by a major normal fault; the western block is the footwall that is dropped relative to the eastern block. Another fault exists in the NE part of the field and is characterized by a minor horst.

== Petroleum system ==
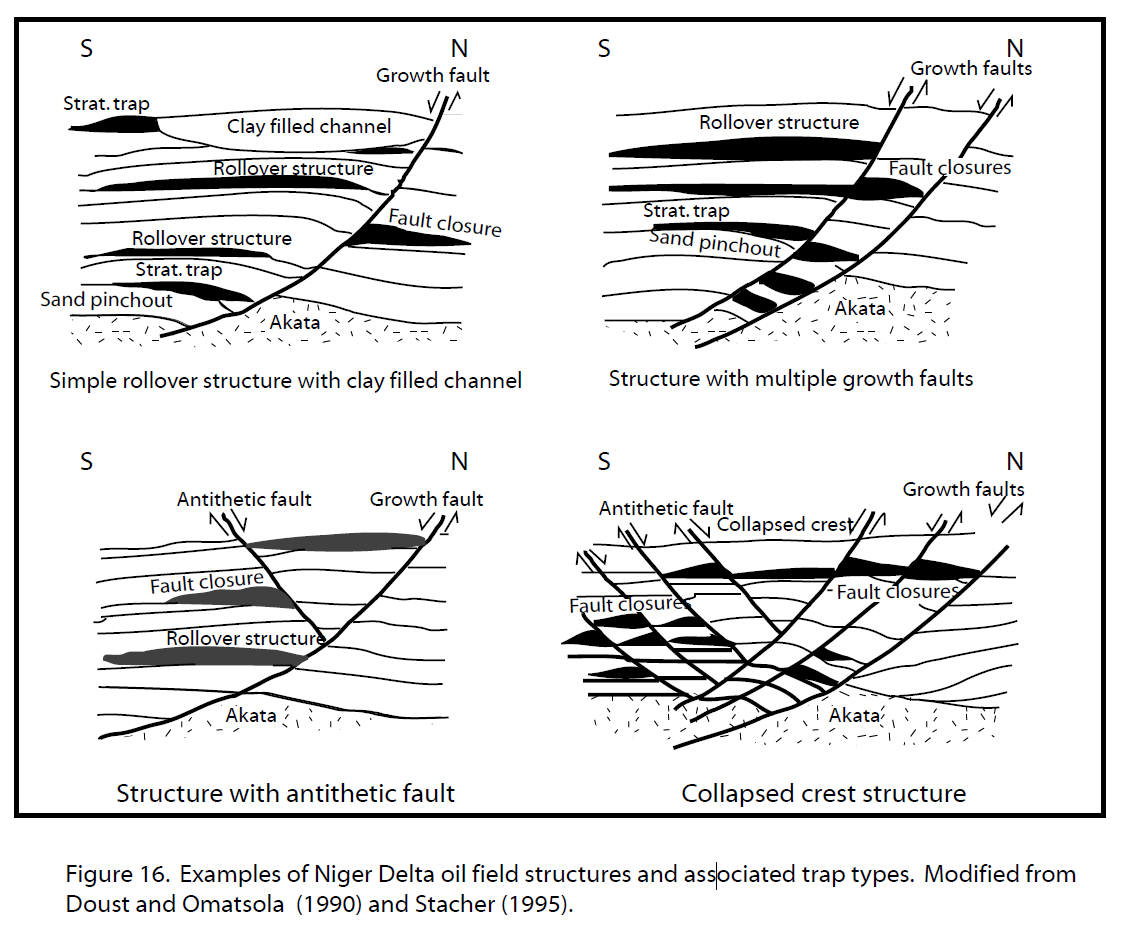
Examples of Oil Traps in the Niger Delta from USGS Open-File Report 99-50-H (1999)

=== Trap and seal ===
Trap and seal formation in the Tertiary Niger Delta (Akata–Agbada) Petroleum System is related to gravity tectonics within the delta. In the Delta Field, growth faults provide transportation pathways from the Akata formation to the Agbada Formation. Anticlinal closures and fault assisted closures are found in the Delta Field and can act as structural traps, which developed during synsedimentary deformation of the Agbada paralic sequence. Wells in the western fault block target a rollover anticline. To date, structural traps have only been explored in the Delta Field but stratigraphic traps are present in deeper and more distal portions of the delta. Structural traps mainly include rollover anticlines and fault closures. The primary seal for the delta is the interbedded shales within the Agbada Formation. The seals can be classified into three types: (1) clay smears along faults, (2), interbedded shale aided by fault placement, and (3) vertical seals. Clay-filled canyons exist on the delta slope; the canyons formed as the result of major erosional events in the Middle Miocene.

=== Source Rock and Reservoir ===
For the Delta Field, the main source rock is the Akata Formation with the Agbada Formation acting as the reservoir rock. However, interbedded shale in the lower Agbada Formation also acts as a source rock. However, the Agbada source rock intervals rarely have the thickness needed to be considered a world class oil province. A 1980 study of source rocks throughout the delta shows total organic carbon (TOC) ranges from 0.4% to 14.4%. Other studies have only reported TOC values as high as 5.2% or with averages of 2.4%. Another study— who studied the TOC in sandstones, siltstones, and shales—show TOC averages of 1.4% to 1.6% and note that TOC decreases with decreasing age.

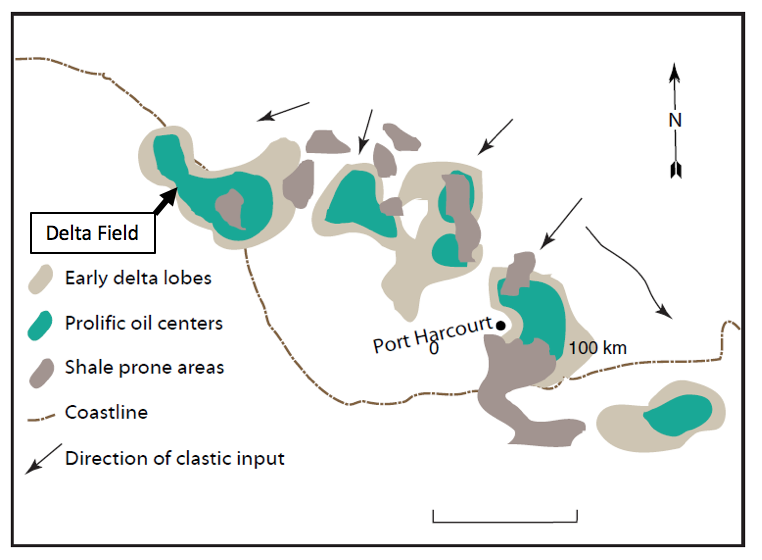
Schematic showing the location of lobes of the early Niger Delta, prolific oil centers, and shale prone areas. (USGS Open-File Report 99-50-H, 1999).

In other areas of the Niger Delta, particularly in deeper water settings, delta slope and deep turbidite fans are the depositional systems of the source rock, which have organic matter of a terrestrial signature as well as amorphous, hydrogen-rich matter from bacterial degradation. Other studies have speculated that Cretaceous shales could also be source rocks but, because they have not been drilled, no data exist to identify the potential.

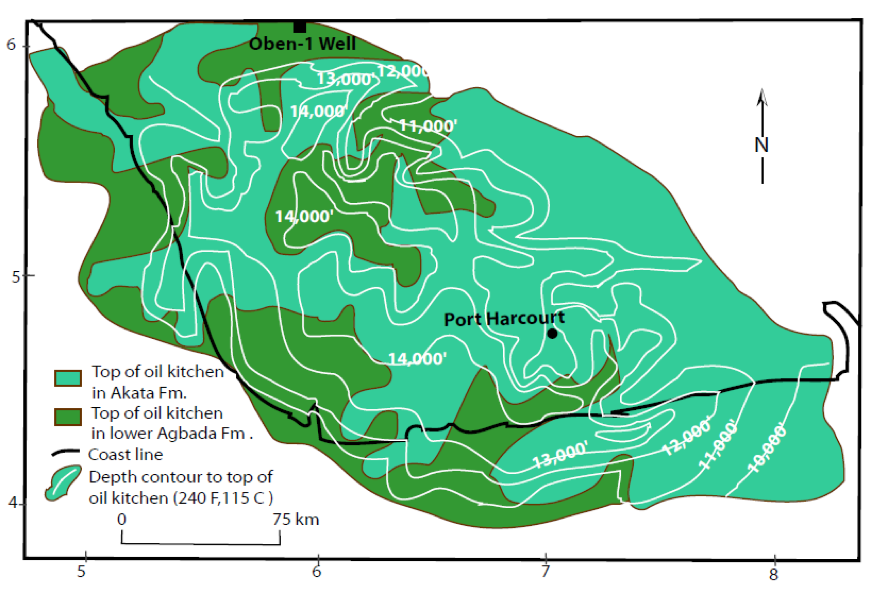
Subsurface depth to top of Niger Delta oil kitchen showing where the Akata Formation is in the oil window and where lower Agbada is in the oil window. USGS Open-File Report 99-50-H (1999) and modified from Evamy and others (1978).

Hydrocarbons throughout the delta and in the Delta Field are produced from the Agbada Formation, mainly in the form of sandstone and unconsolidated sands. Thicker sand reservoirs represent stacked channels and point bars, distributary channels, and coastal barrier bars are important reservoir types in the delta. The paralic sandstones have porosity values of 40% and 2 darcys permeability. Lateral variations in reservoir thickness are the result of growth faults and porosity slowly increases with depth due to the young age of the sediment.

=== Petroleum generation and migration ===
Studies to date have set the top of the present-day oil window of the Niger Delta at the 240 °F isotherm. n the northwestern portion of the Niger Delta, which is where the Delta Field is location, the oil window lies in the upper Akata Formation and the lower Agbada Formation. At different areas in the delta, the oil and gas window depth varies as a result of differing thermal gradients and is dependent on the gross distribution of sand and shale. The Benin Formation has the lowest thermal gradient (1.3 to 1.8 °C/100 m) followed by the Agbada Formation (2.7 °C/100 m) and finally the over-pressured Akata Formation (5.5 °C/100 m). However, sand/shale distribution is not the only controlling factor on oil window depth; temperature, time and deformation due to tectonic events also influence temperature at depth.

== Drilling ==
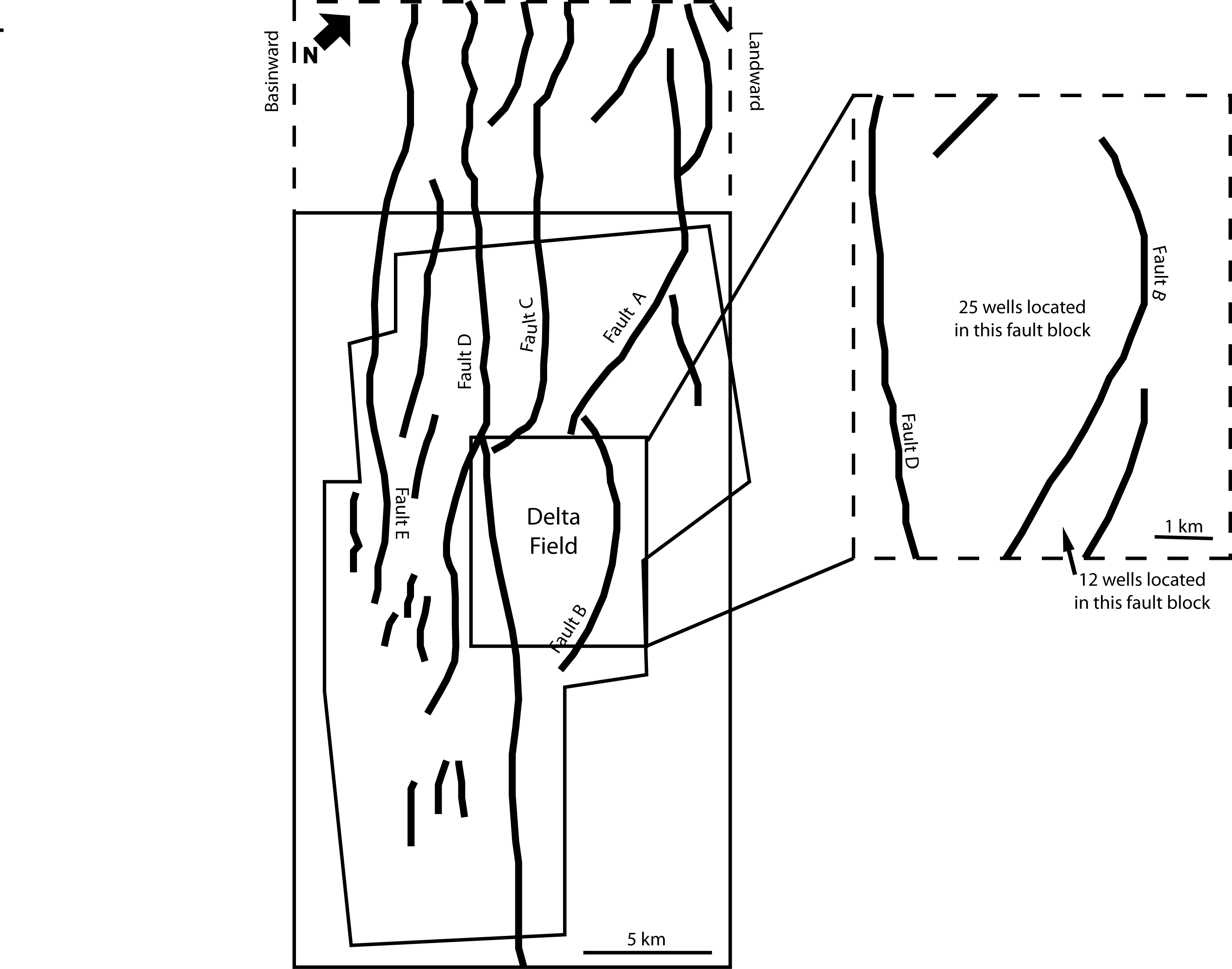
Location of the major faults and well locations within the Delta Field (Modified after Owoyemi and Willis, 2006).

As of 2013, 37 wells (14 vertical and 23 deviated) have been drilled in the Delta Field, most of which are drilled to the base of the Agbada formation. 12 of the wells are in the eastern fault block with the other 25 being located in the western fault block. All of the wells have targeted the middle Agbada formation, where the structural prospect was found. Prior to 2000, 53 distinct reservoirs had been discovered in the Delta Field.
