= Type 1 and type 2 sequence =

In sequence stratigraphy, a sub discipline of geology, type 1 sequences and type 2 sequences are special sequences that are defined by having distinct types of sequence boundaries. In modern literature, the distinction in type 1 sequences and type 2 sequences was abandoned.

== Definition ==
=== Type 1 and 2 sequence boundary ===
A type 1 sequence boundary is defined to be a sequence boundary "characterized by subaerial exposure and concurrent subaerial erosion associated with stream rejuvenation, a basinward shift of facies, a downward shift in coastal onlap, and onlap of overlying strata". Similarly, a type 2 sequence boundary is "marked by subaerial exposure and a downward shift in coastal onlap landward of the depositional-shoreline break; however, it lacks both subaerial erosion associated with stream rejuvenation and a basinward shift in facies"

So the main distinction between type 1 and type 2 sequence boundaries is the amount of subaerial exposure. Type 2 sequence boundaries display, in contrast to type 1 sequence boundaries, only little subaerial exposure.

=== Type 1 and 2 sequence ===
With the notions introduced above, a type 1 sequence is a sequence that is bounded by a type 1 sequence boundary below and a type 1 or a type 2 sequence boundary above.

Similarly, a type 2 sequence is a sequence that is bounded by a type 2 sequence boundary below and a type 1 or a type 2 sequence boundary above.

== Usage ==
The definition of a type 1 and type 2 sequence was first introduced by Vail et al. (1984). Since they were hard to recognize, they were redefined in 1990 by Van Wagoner et al.. However even with this new definition, type 2 sequence boundaries were hard to recognize in the field due to their lack of subaerial exposure. Therefore, the abandonment of this nomenclature was recommended by Posamentier and Allen in 1999.
