= Growth fault =

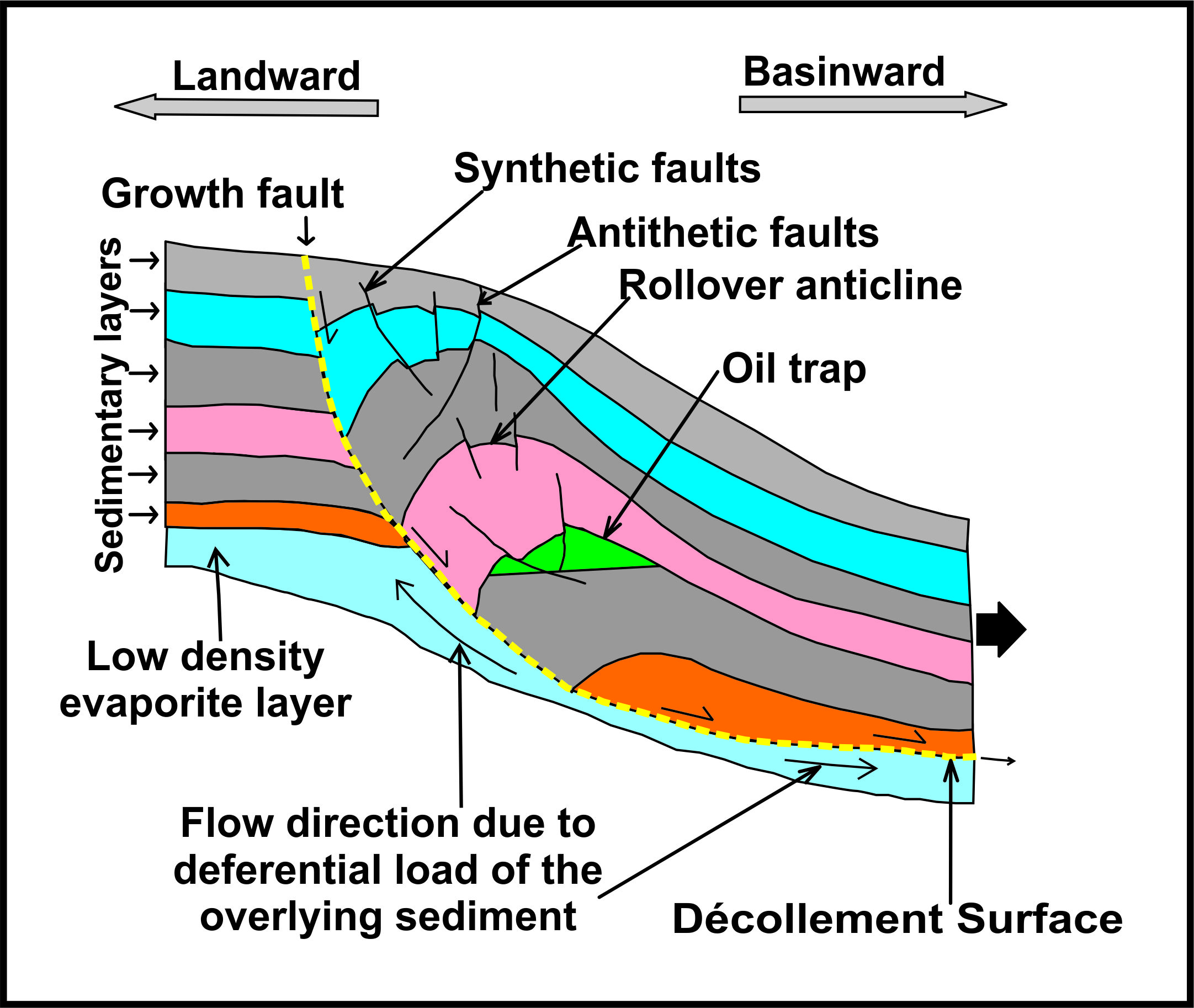
Fig. 1. Sketch showing a well-developed growth fault and accompanying structures.

Growth faults are syndepositional or syn-sedimentary extensional faults that initiate and evolve at the margins of continental plates. They extend parallel to passive margins that have high sediment supply. Their fault plane dips mostly toward the basin and has long-term continuous displacement. Figure one shows a growth fault with a concave upward fault plane that has high updip angle and flattened at its base into zone of detachment or décollement. This angle is continuously changing from nearly vertical in the updip area to nearly horizontal in the downdip area.

Sedimentary layers have different geometry and thickness across the fault. The footwall – landward of the fault plane – has undisturbed sedimentary strata that dip gently toward the basin while the hanging wall – on the basin side of the fault plane – has folded and faulted sedimentary strata that dip landward close to the fault and basinward away from it. These layers perch on a low density evaporite or over-pressured shale bed that easily flows away from higher pressure into lower pressure zones. Most studies since the 1990s concentrate on the growth faults' driving forces, kinematics and accompanied structures since they are helpful in fossil fuel explorations as they form structural traps for oil.

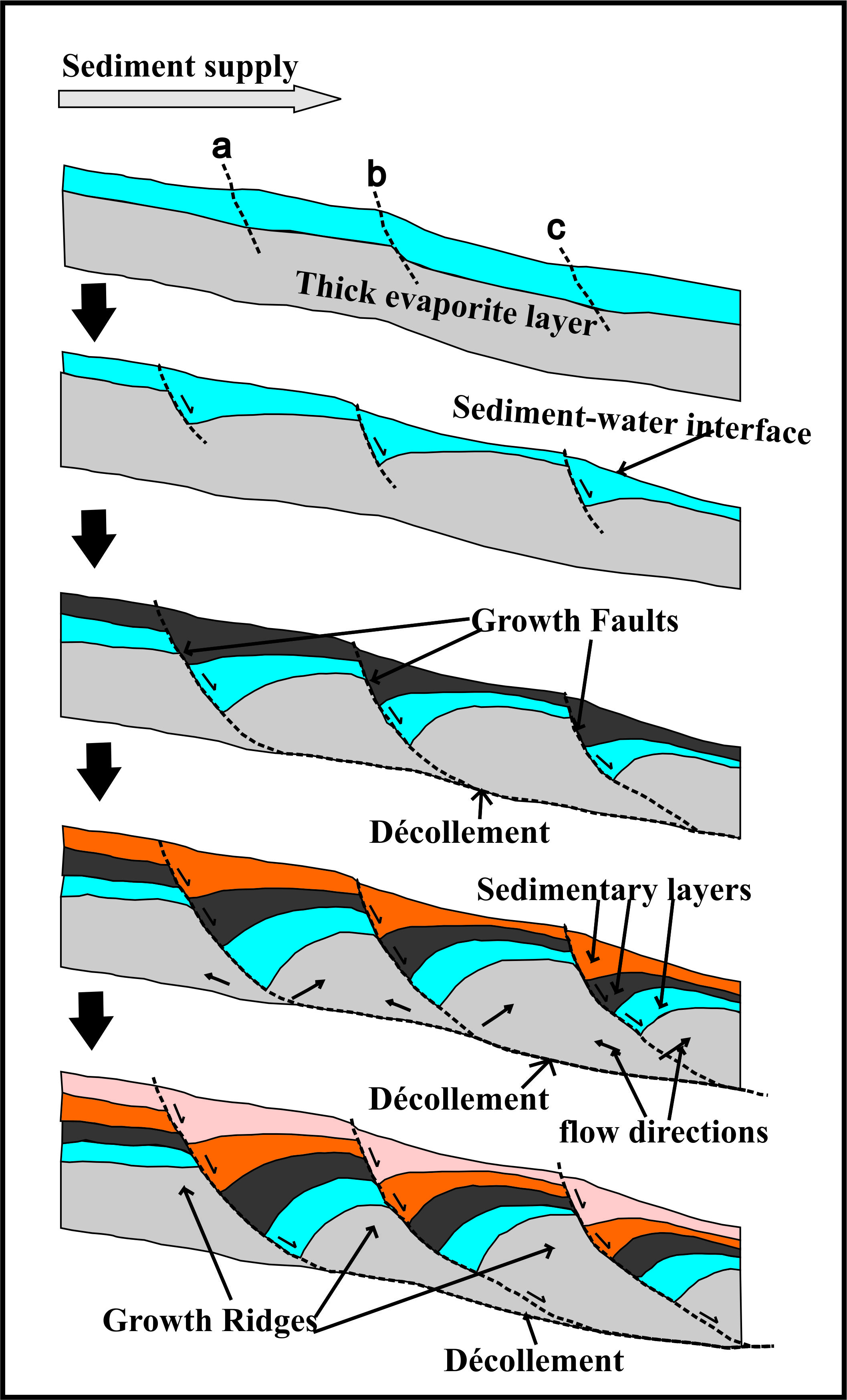
Figure 2. Sketch showing evolution stages of three growth faults. The black arrow shows the direction of evolution.

== Growth fault dynamics ==
Growth faults maturation is a long term process that takes millions of years with slip rate ranges between 0.2-1.2 millimeters per year. It starts when sedimentary sequences are deposited on top of each other above a thick evaporite layer (fig. 2). A growth fault is initiated when the evaporite layer can no longer support the overlying sequences. The thicker and denser portion applies much more pressure on the evaporite layer than the thin portion. As a result, a flow within the evaporite layer is initiated from high pressure areas toward low pressure areas causing growth ridges to form below the thin portion. Also, sinking zones are noticed among these ridges at areas where thicker and denser layers form(fig. 2).

Consequently, the passive margin experience unequal subsidence across the continental shelf. Both the new-created accommodation spaces and the thickness of the new-deposited sedimentary layers are greater above the sinking zones than above the growth ridges. The new added layers are thicker within the footwall than within the hanging wall (fig. 2). These variations result in an increasing of differential load intensities - unequal distribution of sediments load - across the shelf with time as more sediment layers are added(fig. 2). Therefore, the rate by which the pressure increases upon the evaporite layer below the sinking zone are much more than the rate of pressure increase upon the same evaporite layer at the growth ridges. So, the flow rate within the evaporite layer is progressively increasing as deferential load intensifies(fig. 2). The growth ridges end up with salt diapir when the sinking zone sequences weld to the base of the evaporite layer.

As the fault grows upward, it cuts through the newly formed sedimentary layers at the top. Therefore, the overall displacement along the fault plane is not the same. Further, the lowermost layer has higher displacement than the uppermost layer while the intermediate layer displacement lies in between (fig. 2). Because the fault plane flattens into décollement, the downthrown block moves basinward and the displaced sedimentary layer of the downthrown block bends close to the fault plane forming rollover anticline, synthetic and antithetic faults. Figure 3 is an E-W seismic line at Svalbard area showing footwall, hanging wall and the geometry of sedimentary layers around the fault plane.

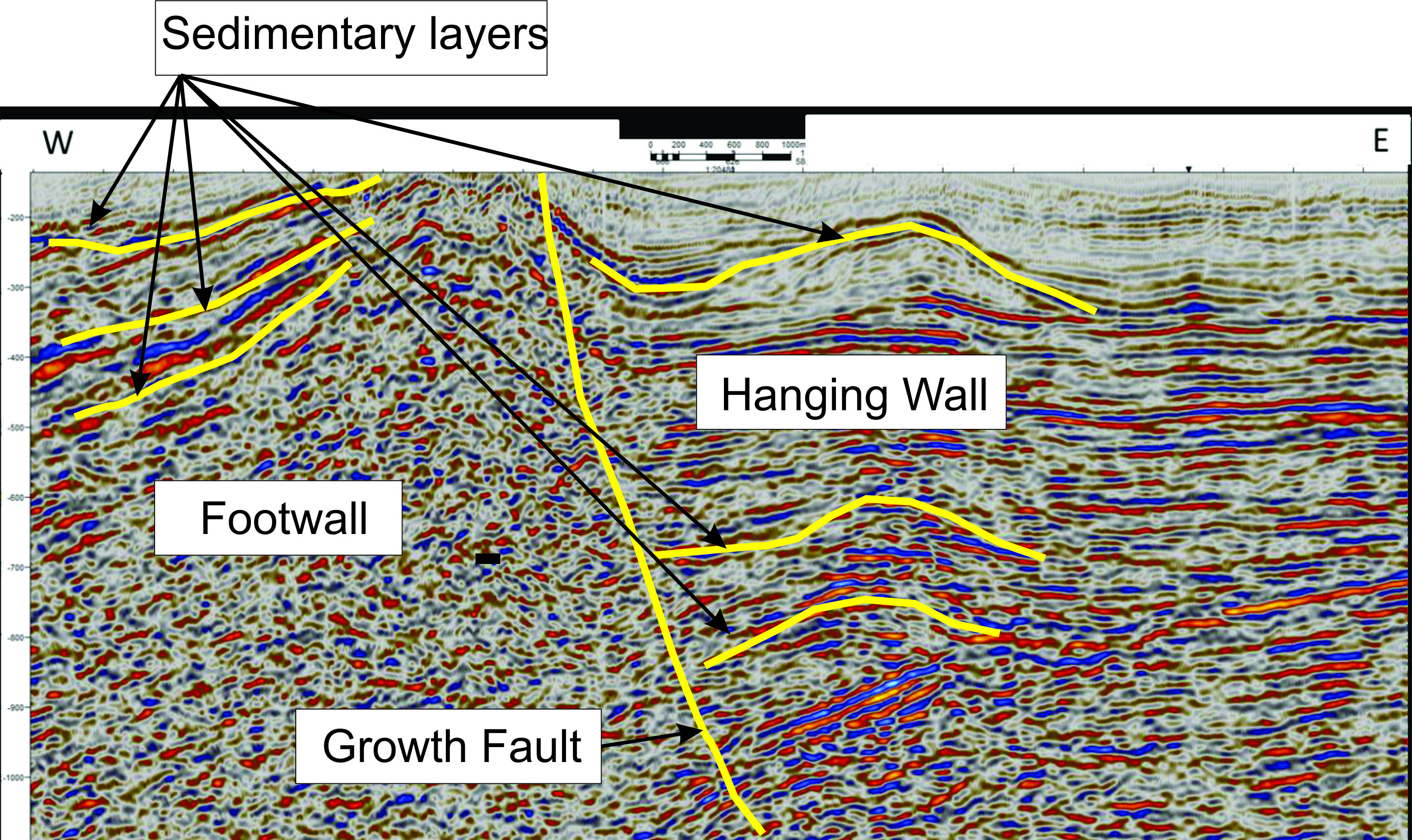
Fig. 3. Seismic line showing sedimentary layers, footwall and hanging wall of a growth fault: Modified after Bjerkvik, 2012

== Accompanied structures ==
Growth faults have two blocks. The upthrown block – the footwall – is landward of the fault plane and the downthrown block – the hanging wall – is basinward of the fault plane. Most deformations occur within the hanging wall side. The downthrown block slips downward and basinward relative to the upthrown block. This is caused due to the differential load of the overlying sediments and the high mobility of the lowermost low density layer.

As a result, the sedimentary layers collapse forming synthetic and antithetic dip-slip faults that dip in the same direction or in the opposite direction of the main growth fault respectively or bend forming rollover anticlines close to the fault plane. Those structures are usually formed simultaneously and are thought to be created as a result of sediments filling the gap that is formed hypothetically by the basinward movement of the downthrown block.

== Driving force ==
The main driving forces of the growth faults are the deferential sediments load and the low density layers - evaporites or over-pressured shale - that are formed during or right after the rifting process. Growth faults are located mainly within passive margin sedimentary wedges where tectonic forces have minimum or no effect. These passive margins receive millions of tons of sediments every year which are concentrated on the continental shelf below base level and above areas where the water velocity is no longer supporting the particles weight. This zone is called depositional center (depocenter for short) and has higher sediments load.

Evaporites and/or high-pressured shale layers have the ability to flow because of their high mobility and low viscosity characteristics. Rift zones are partially restricted and have limited access to open oceans during rifting period. they are affected by sea level changes and climatic variability. Thick layers of evaporites are formed due to continuous water evaporation and fill of the rift basin.

Shale beds that are deposited during the rift-drift stage have high porosity and low permeability. This encloses much fluid which under pressure causing the whole shale bed to turn into a viscous, low density, high mobility layer. The over-pressured shale layers trigger and initiate the growth faults in the same way as the evaporite layers does.

Earthquakes arise and result from the release of the force along the growth fault plane. The depocenter's exact location continuously changes because eustatic and relative sea level are continuously changing as well. As a result, many different growth faults are created as sediment loads shift basinward and landward.

== Importance of growth faults ==
Growth faults have great significance for stratigraphy, structural geology and the petroleum industry. They account for relative and eustatic sea level changes and accommodation space left for new sediments. Likewise, growth faults are connected directly to the subsidence in the coastal and continental shelf areas. Moreover, they explain lateral thickness variation of sedimentary sequences across these faults. The updip area on the downthrown block is the main target of oil and gas exploration because it has synthetic and antithetic faults and rollover anticlines. These are considered as structural traps preventing oil and gas from escaping.

The offset of sand and shale beds occurring along fault planes bring sand and shale layers in contact to each other. This blocks oil and gas lateral movements and enhances vertical movements. At shallow depths, growth faults and their accompanying synthetic and antithetic faults are considered as vertical pathways for groundwater to flow and mix between different groundwater reservoirs. At deeper areas, these conduits help geologists track petroleum migration up to their final destinations. Oil and gas exploration is usually concentrated very close to these faults in the downthrown block because these are considered as structural traps preventing oil and gas from escaping.

== Future work ==
Because the growth faults and their accompanied structures control both horizontal and vertical migration of the underground fluids, most of the current and future studies focus on constructing three-dimensional models in order to understand geometry and kinematics of these structures. This will unravel the mystery behind the groundwater contamination due to reservoir mixing, and track the oil and gas migration pathways.
