= Geology of French Guiana =

Guyana belongs to the Guiana Shield, a massif extending north of the Amazon, between the Andes Mountains and the Atlantic, made up of Precambrian rocks dated to between 2.7 and 3.5 billion years ago. The shield consists of several geological units: the southern peneplain, the Inini synclinorium, the central granite massifs and the northern synclinorium. The southern peneplain consists of a set of granito-gneiss consisting of metagabbros, metagranodiorites and metagranites dating from 2075 ± 7 Ma from a magma of metamorphosed mantle origin. To the north, the southern peneplain straddles the Inini synclinorium, mainly composed of the Paramaca series, which corresponds to a series of micaschists, aluminous paragneisses and black quartzites whose total thickness is about 1 km. The central granite massifs consist of granite plutons, granodiorites and quartz diorites dating from 2.05 to 2.15 billion years ago. The north of French Guiana corresponds to a synclinorium composed of the Paramaca series on which sandstone and fluviatile conglomerates lie unconformably. Shield rocks in Guyana are all dated between 1.6 and 2.5 billion years ago.

The Quaternary lands are located in the northern part of Guyana, near the coast, unconformably on the Paleozoic lands. The coastal plains consist of thin layers (between 8 and 15 meters in the old plain) of marine clay, sand and pebbles. The newest fields contain organic matter such as peat or shells. Fluvial alluvia of continental origin are mainly located in the lower reaches of the rivers, they are mainly sandy products. They come from the erosion of the Precambrian basement of the Guyanese Shield.
