= Robert E. Sheriff =

American geophysicist (1922-2014)

- Born: 19 April 1922; Mansfield, Ohio
- Died: 19 November 2014 (aged 92); Missouri City, Texas
- Education: Chemistry, Physics
- Alma mater: Wittenberg University; Ohio State University
- Known for: The Manhattan Project; Encyclopedic Dictionary of Applied Geophysics
- Spouse: Margaret
- Children: Anne, Rick, Jeanne, Susan, Barbara, and Linda
- Awards: Maurice Ewing medal (1998); Hayden Williams Fellow (1993); Kauffman Gold Medal (1969)
- Scientific career
- Fields: Geophysics
- Institutions: Chevron; Seiscom-Delta Corporation; University of Houston

Robert E. Sheriff (19 April 1922 – 19 November 2014) was an American geophysicist best known for writing the comprehensive geophysical reference, Encyclopedic Dictionary of Exploration Geophysics. His main research interests included the seismic detailing of reservoirs, in 3-D seismic interpretation and seismic stratigraphy, and practical applications of geophysical (especially seismic) methods. Hua-Wei Zhou, Department Chair of the Department of Earth and Atmospheric Sciences, said about Sheriff: “…a giant figure in the world of exploration geophysics… When I think about Bob, a number of key words pop up in my mind: kindness, honesty, hardworking, seeking perfection, generosity and wisdom.”

== Career ==
Sheriff worked on uranium isotope separation for the World War II Manhattan Project in Oak Ridge, Tennessee. He worked on this project from 1943-1946. After receiving his masters and PhD in physics, Sheriff accepted a job at Standard of California (Chevron) to work in their new geophysical research lab. Serving in a variety of functions, including managing geophysical crews and drilling activity overseas, Sheriff worked at Chevron for 25 years. Sheriff went on to work 5 years as Senior Vice-President of Development with Seiscom-Delta Corporation before moving to academia at the University of Houston. He served as a tenured professor in the Department of Earth and Atmospheric Sciences for 23 years before retiring. He served as Professor Emeritus after his retirement.

Sheriff was one of the originators of the geophysical topic, attributes, and is coauthor of what some consider the seminal article in the field, Complex trace analysis (GEOPHYSICS, 1979).

== Society of Exploration Geophysicists ==
Sheriff served as First Vice President for Society of Exploration Geophysicists (SEG) from 1972-73. In 1969, Sheriff received the SEG Virgil Kauffman Medal for his initial publication of the Encyclopedic Dictionary of Exploration Geophysics. Sheriff received SEG's highest award in 1998, the Maurice Ewing Award, for his lifetime achievements in geophysics. In 2006, SEG members voted the 1973 dictionary as the top geophysical book ever published for the industry, citing a copy could be found in every working exploration office.

Lee Lawyer said in Sheriff’s citation for the Maurice Ewing Medal that Sheriff was in the forefront of such major trends in geophysical theory as hydrocarbon indicators, sequence stratigraphy, and reservoir geophysics. In addition, he was responsible for the first poster session at an SEG Annual Meeting, arranged the SEG technical presentations at the first two Offshore Technology Conferences, and co-organized industry-academic seminars to expedite transfer of knowledge between campus and industry.

=== Encyclopedic Dictionary of Applied Geophysics ===
Sheriff created a 30-page pamphlet to support his training classes as well as help train employees on the latest concepts in geophysics. After a past SEG president received the pamphlet, the president recommended to the SEG membership that the document be expanded. This document served as the foundation for what would become the Encyclopedic Dictionary. It transformed from a 30-page glossary to 429 pages in its 4th edition.

Each subsequent edition of the dictionary saw significant increases in the number of terms. The third edition (published in 1991) contained 20% more entries than the second (published in 1984). The fourth (published in 2002) had 61 more pages of definitions than the third. For over four decades Sheriff updated the dictionary to reflect the latest technology and research in geophysics.

== Honors ==
- 1998: Maurice Ewing medal of SEG for lifetime work in geophysics
- 1997: Quest for Excellence Award, University of Houston College of Natural Sciences and Mathematics
- 1996: Special Commendation Award, Society of Exploration Geophysicists
- 1993: Hayden Williams Fellow, Curtin Univ. of Tech., Perth, W.Australia
- 1993: Distinguished lecturer, Australian Society of Exploration Geophy.
- 1980: Honorary Membership in Geophysical Society of Houston
- 1979: Honorary Membership in Society of Exploration Geophysicists
- 1977: Distinguished lecturer, Society of Exploration Geophysicists
- 1969: Kauffman Gold Medal of SEG for outstanding contribution to geophysics

== Principle books ==
- Sheriff, Robert E., and Lloyd P. Geldart. Problems in Exploration Seismology and their solutions. Tulsa, OK: Society of Exploration Geophysicists, 2004. doi:10.1190/1.9781560801733
- Sheriff, Robert E. Encyclopedic Dictionary of Applied Geophysics. Tulsa, OK: Society of Exploration Geophysicists, 2002. Print. doi:10.1190/1.9781560802969
- Sheriff, Robert E., and Alistair R. Brown. Reservoir Geophysics. Tulsa, OK: Society of Exploration Geophysicists, 1992. Print. ISBN 1560800577.
- Sheriff, Robert E., W.M. Telford, W.M., and Lloyd P. Geldart. Applied Geophysics. Cambridge: Cambridge UP, 1990. Print.
- Sheriff, Robert E. Geophysical Methods. Englewood Cliffs, NJ: Prentice Hall, 1989. Print. ISBN 0-13-352568-6.
- Sheriff, Robert E., and Lloyd P. Geldart. Exploration Seismology. Cambridge: Cambridge UP, 1982. Print. ISBN 978-0521468268.
- Sheriff, Robert E. Seismic Stratigraphy. Boston: International Human Resources Development, 1980. Print. ISBN 0-934634-08-4.

== See also ==
- Dolores Proubasta, Associate Editor (1995). ”Bob Sheriff — Getting a better picture.” Bob Sheriff — Getting a better picture, 14(9), 941-945. doi:10.1190/1.1437181
- Robert E. Sheriff (1991). ”How in the world I came to write the Encyclopedic Dictionary.” How in the world I came to write the Encyclopedic Dictionary, 10(4), 41-43. doi:10.1190/1.1436817
- Robert E. Sheriff (1985). ”History of geophysical technology through advertisements in GEOPHYSICS.” History of geophysical technology through advertisements in GEOPHYSICS, 50(12), 2299-2408. doi:10.1190/1.1441872
