= Delta Field =

Delta Field can refer to

- Delta Field (Niger Delta), an oil field in Nigeria
- Delta Field (Minneapolis), a defunct college baseball venue in Minneapolis, Minnesota
- McCool Stadium in Mississippi
