= Marine clay =

Type of clay found in coastal regions around the world

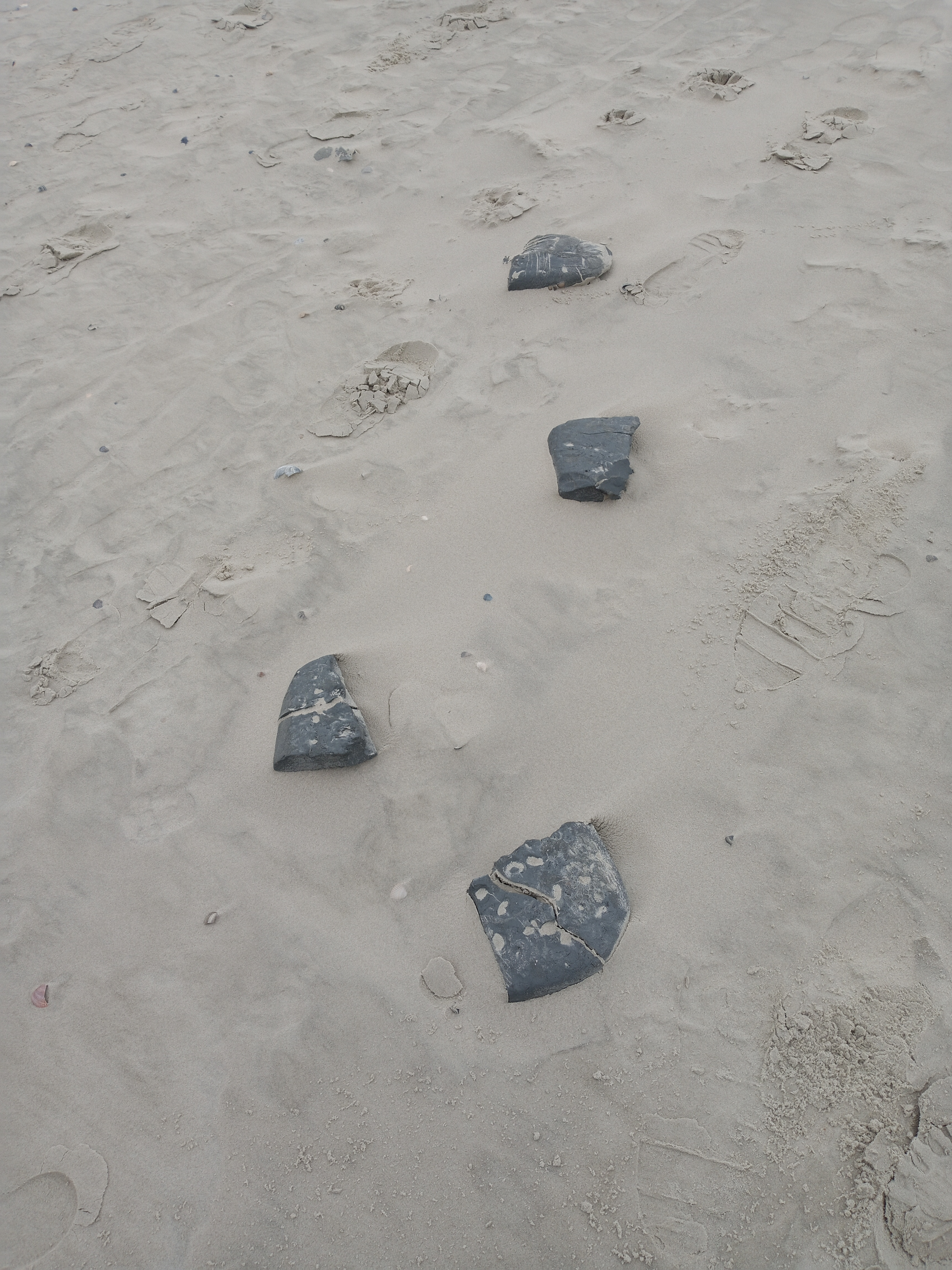
Lumps of marine clay (about 20cm in length) on the beach of Norderney, Germany.

Marine clays are fine-grained sedimentary deposits composed primarily of clay minerals that accumulate in coastal environments. They are typically derived from the weathering of continental rocks, transported to an ocean, where they settle and consolidate on the seabed. Marine clays commonly contain minerals such as illite, smectite, kaolinite, and chlorite, along with varying amounts of silt, organic matter, and biogenic materials. The saline conditions during deposition influence their structure and bonding, often producing high natural water contents, and low permeability. Marine clays exhibit high sensitivity, meaning their internal structure is fragile and can lose much of its strength when disturbed.

The structure and properties of marine clays depend on regional geological conditions such as tectonic activity, erosion, and sediment deposition. In addition to their sources, marine clays are shaped by their stress history and environmental factors, including interactions between water and minerals, fluctuations in water levels caused by tides or climate change, and variations in salinity and acidity.

USDA classifies marine clay particles as being less than 0.002 millimetres (7.9×10^{−5} in) in diameter. Particles can become suspended in water; heavier sand settles quickly, while finer silt and clay particles remain suspended longer. Marine clay particles, being very small and often negatively charged, can resist settling and sometimes stay suspended indefinitely, this is also known as turbidity, in which suspended particles create a murky brown color.

Once the clay is deposited on the ocean floor it can change its structure through a process known as flocculation, process by which fine particulates are caused to clump together or floc. In estuarine systems, the changes in physicochemical conditions from the river side to the sea side triggers flocculation and leads to estuarine siltation. This is one of the main causes for the dredging activities in harbors. Organic matter in particular plays a major role in marine clay flocculation as it can adhere to marine clay particles. Particles can also be aggregated or shifted in their structure besides being flocculated.

== Particles configurations ==
This basic structure of clay minerals consists of one cation, usually silica or aluminum surrounded by hydroxide anions, These minerals form in sheets, known as clay particles, and have very specific properties to them including micro porosity which is the ability of clay to hold water against the force of gravity, shrink swell capacity and absorption capabilities. There are two basic types of sheets in clay minerals, the tetrahedral silica sheets, and the octahedral aluminum or magnesium sheets.

Marine clay particles can adopt different arrangements, and their structure and behavior depend on the types of exchange cations (charged ions of sodium, potassium, or calcium) that attach to them. Different cations lead to different arrangements and therefore different properties of the clay.

When clay is deposited in the ocean, the presence of excess ions in seawater causes a loose, open structure of the clay particles to form, a process known as flocculation. Once stranded and dried by ancient changing ocean levels, this open framework means that such clay is open to water infiltration. Construction in marine clays thus presents a geotechnical engineering challenge.

Where marine clay overlies peat, it may mark a marine flooding surface. This transition reflects the landward shift of coastal geography during a phase of relative sea-level rise.

== Effect on foundations ==
Pavements constructed over marine clay subgrades soils, reduce long‑term durability and increased whole-life costs. Marine clays are sensitive to weathering, which affects soil mechanics and support under structural loads, and limits both bearing capacity and associated service life.

The swapping of this positive cation with another is what makes different types of clays including Kaolinite, montmorillonite, smectite and illite. This happens in marine clays because the ocean's water is high in solution with cations making it very easy to overcome the clays negative net charge and swap the clays cation with a less positive one. These marine clays can be what are known as quick clays, which are notorious for its erosive properties. A great example of these quick clays is in the Pacific Northwest. They are known as blue goo which is a mix of clay and mélange (greenstone, basalt, chert, shale, sandstone, schists. uplifted through the accretionary wedge). These quick clays have a very high-risk factor associated with them if they are built upon, as they are very unstable due to the fact that liquefaction happens when it becomes saturated and literally flows, causing mass wasting events to happen.

Geotechnical problems posed by marine clay can be handled by various ground improvement techniques. During the construction of Marina Barrage in Singapore, marine clay was found at the site. Given the known risk of soft marine clay in deep excavations, foundation design for the Marina Barrage project incorporated extensive geotechnical analysis that anticipated the ground response of the marine clay encountered at the site.

Marine clay can be stabilized by mixing it with cement and fly ash binding materials in specific proportions. Dredged marine clay can be adapted as roadbed using wastes of various industries.

== Uses ==
Marine clays have been used in ancient and traditional ceramics for heat resistant ceramics products like cookware, and refractory bricks. For these clays to be available for human use they must have been eroded, deposited on the ocean floor and then uplifted through means of tectonic activity to bring it to land.

Marine clays are used as low‑permeability liners for limiting landfill leachate. Marine clay minerals also provide landfills with useful adsorptive properties.

== Bibliography ==
- Deng, Yong-feng; Yue, Xi-bing; Cui, Yong-jie; Shao, Guang-hui; Liu, Song-yu; Zhang, Dong-wei (1 June 2014). "Effect of pore water chemistry on the hydro-mechanical behaviour of Lianyungang soft marine clay". Applied Clay Science. 95: 167–175. doi:10.1016/j.clay.2014.04.007.
- Zhang, R. J.; Santoso, A. M.; Tan, T. S.; Phoon, K. K. (2013). "Strength of high water-content marine clay stabilized by low amount of cement". Journal of Geotechnical and Geoenvironmental Engineering. 139 (12). American Society of Civil Engineers: 2170–2181. doi:10.1061/(ASCE)GT.1943-5606.0000951.
- Kamruzzaman, A. H. M.; Chew, S. H.; Lee, F. H. (2009). "Structuration and destructuration behavior of cement-treated Singapore marine clay". Journal of Geotechnical and Geoenvironmental Engineering. 135 (4). American Society of Civil Engineers: 573–589. doi:10.1061/(ASCE)1090-0241(2009)135:4(573).
- Holmkvist, Lars; Kamyshny Jr., Alexey; Brüchert, Volker; Ferdelman, Timothy G.; Jørgensen, Bo Barker (1 October 2014). "Sulfidization of lacustrine glacial clay upon Holocene marine transgression (Arkona Basin, Baltic Sea)". Geochimica et Cosmochimica Acta. 142: 75–94. doi:10.1016/j.gca.2014.07.030.
- Dezi, Francesca; Gara, Fabrizio; Roia, Davide (2017). "Linear and nonlinear dynamic response of piles in soft marine clay". Journal of Geotechnical and Geoenvironmental Engineering. 143 (1). American Society of Civil Engineers. doi:10.1061/(ASCE)GT.1943-5606.0001580.
