= Subaerial unconformity =

In geology, a subaerial unconformity is a surface that displays signs of erosion by processes that commonly occur on the surface. These processes generating the subaerial unconformity can include wind degradation, pedogenesis, dissolution processes such as karstification as well as fluvial processes such as fluvial erosion, bypass and river rejuvenation.

== Role in sequence stratigraphy ==
Subaerial unconformities are used as limiting surfaces that define sequences in sequence stratigraphy. In this context they are synonymous with the terms lowstand unconformity, regressive surface of fluvial erosion as well as fluvial entrenchment surface and incision surface.
