= Sequence (geology) =

Geological events, processes, or rocks, arranged in chronological order

In geology, a sequence is a stratigraphic unit which is bounded by an unconformity at the top and at the bottom.

== Definition ==
In a more rigorous and general way, a sequence is defined as a

"relatively conformable [...], genetically related succession of strata bounded by unconformities or their correlative surfaces"

== Special cases and related concepts ==
Special cases of sequences include type 1 sequences and type 2 sequences. A related concept are parasequences. Contrary to their name they are not smaller sequences.

== See also ==
- Catena (soil)
- Sequence stratigraphy
