= Anambra Basin =

Anambra Basin is one of the energy-rich inland sedimentary basins in Nigeria. It is a nearly triangular shaped embayment covering about 3000 km^{2} with a total sedimentary thickness of approximately 9 km. The Basin lying between 6°–7.8°N latitude and 6°40'–7°30'E longitude, is an area of agricultural and fisheries production. Fish species of genus Clarias are common in the basin especially in the dry season.

== Location ==
The Anambra Basin is situated west of the lower Benue Trough and is often considered the youngest formation of the Benue Trough. The basin is bounded to the south by the Niger Delta Basin hinge line. It extends north-westward into the Niger Valley, northward to the Jos Massif and north-eastward into Lafia. The eastern and western limits of the basin are defined by the Abakaliki Anticlinorium and Ibadan massif, respectively.

== Energy resources ==
The basin harbours the largest deposit inland crude oil, natural gas, coal, lignite in Nigeria. Coal mining in Nigeria started in Enugu within the basin. Albert Kitson discovered coal in 1909 at the Udi Ridge, Enugu; turning the region into a strategic British business area. Some of the coal mines operated in Enugu included Ogbete, Ribadu, Onyeama, Okaba and Okpara.

The Anambra Basin is a promising inland hydrocarbon energy hub in Africa and holds Nigeria’s Gas future as many believe it is the next Niger Delta basin in hydrocarbon potentials. In addition to coal, the basin holds potential in Crude oil and Natural gas. Industry experts believe that crude oil quantity is over 15 billion barrels while natural gas stand at 120 trillion cubic feet as it remains untapped The Ugwuoba gas fields near Awka, and Igbariam gas fields near Onitsha - an economic hub in the region, contain some of the successfully explored gas wells in the basin. Some of the wells by Shell/BP in the basin include Igbariam-1 and Ajire-1. There are also Akukwa-1 and Akukwa-2 operated between 1938 – 1939 in Ugwuoba. Crude oil deposits have also been reported in some parts of Anambra Basin, with estimated 50 or more billion barrels in reserves.
