= Condensed sections =

Thin strata that span a large time interval

In sequence stratigraphy, condensed sections are strata that are thin, yet span a large time interval. They are associated with the maximum flooding surfaces, represented by sedimentary intervals deposited during the maximum marine transgression.

== Characterization and identification ==
During the maximum marine transgression, shoreline advances landward furthest and the marine environments usually become widespread and deep. With terrigenous sediment supply being further away, sediments are in thin bed characterized by fine-grain particles of distal facies and low rates of sedimentation. Additionally, with relative less dilution by terrigenous influx, sediments are highly fossiliferous and contain rich organic contents. These characters allow condensed sections to be readily recognized by identifying maximum flooding surfaces on seismic profile, analyzing the sedimentary intervals with maximum faunal abundance and diversity in outcrops and cores, and by finding the gamma-ray peaks in well-log data.

== Application ==
Condensed sections, as the best chronological markers, are primary important in stratigraphic correlation, between shallow and deep marine depositional environments. Furthermore, they play a fundamental role in identifying systems tracts to predict depositional facies changes and the associated lithological variations.
