= Parasequence =

Concept of sequence stratigraphy

A parasequence is a fundamental concept of sequence stratigraphy. Parasequences are not directly related to sequences.

== Definition ==
A parasequence is defined as a genetically related succession of bedsets that is bounded by marine flooding surfaces (or their correlative surfaces) on top and at the bottom. The succession is supposed to be relatively conformable in the sense that breaks in deposition within the parasequence are much shorter than the time of deposition of the parasequence itself. Most parasequences show a shallowing upward, which is sometimes also included into the definition.

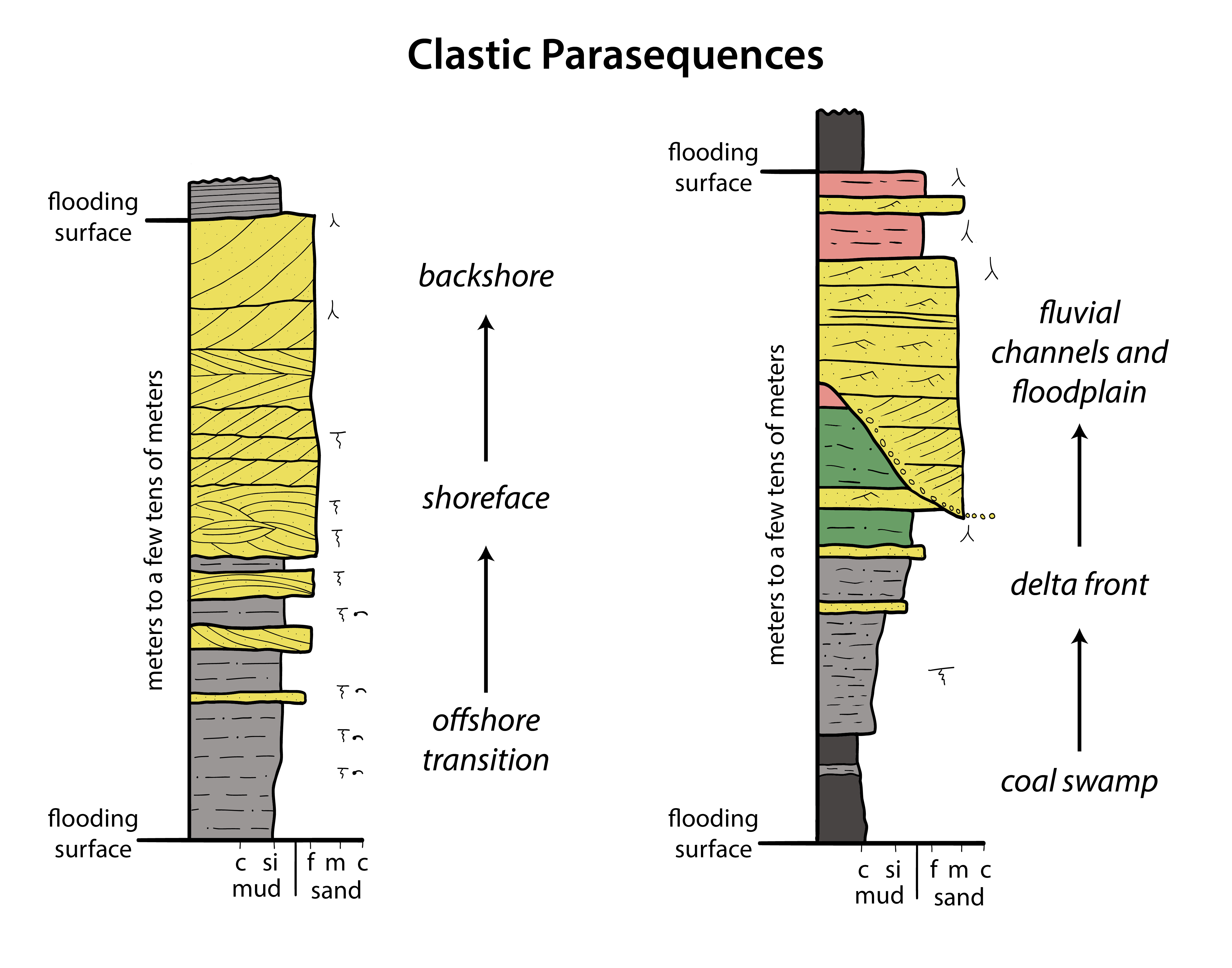
Schematic graphic log showing facies successions in common types of clastic parasequences

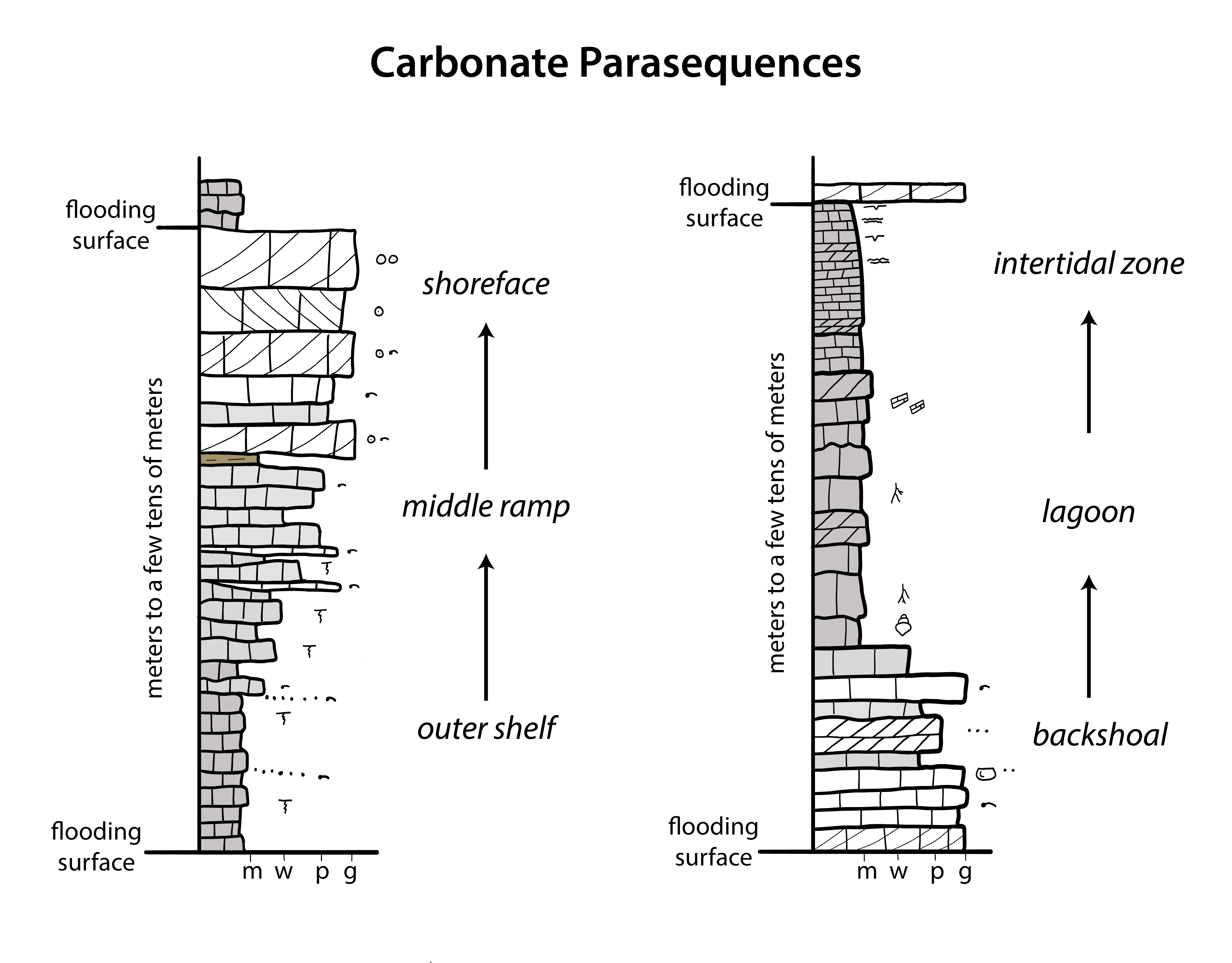
Schematic graphic log showing facies successions in common types of carbonate parasequences

== Properties ==
Since parasequences are relatively conformable, Walther's law applies within a parasequence. This is not necessarily the case for transitions from one parasequence to another. They are also typically of the size of one up to tens of meters.
