= Seismic stratigraphy =

Study of sedimentary rock

Seismic stratigraphy is a method for studying sedimentary rock in the deep subsurface based on seismic data acquisition.

== History ==
The term Seismic stratigraphy was introduced in 1977 by Vail as an integrated stratigraphic and sedimentologic technique to interpret seismic reflection data for stratigraphic correlation and to predict depositional environments and lithology. This technique was initially employed for petroleum exploration and subsequently evolved into sequence stratigraphy by academic institutes.

=== Basic Concept ===
Seismic reflection is generated at interfaces that separate media with different acoustic properties, and traditionally these interfaces have been interpreted as the lithological boundaries. Vail in 1977, however, recognized that these reflections were, in fact, parallel to the bedding surfaces, and therefore time equivalent surfaces. Interruption of reflections indicates the disappearance of bedding surfaces. Hence, onlap, down lap and top lap and other depositional features observed on surface outcrops have been demonstrated on seismic profiles. This revolutionary interpretation has been substantiated by Vail’s associated industrial drilling results and extensive multichannel seismic data. Furthermore, the most indisputable evidence comes from the progradational dipping reflection pattern associated with the advancing delta deposition in shallow marine environments. Lithological boundaries associated with delta front and slope are nearly horizontal, but are not represented by reflections. Instead, the dipping reflections are a clear indication of depositional surfaces, hence time plane equivalents.

=== Methodology ===
==== Establishing Sequence Boundary ====
Sequence boundaries are defined as an erosional unconformity recognized on the seismic profile as a reflection surface with reflection termination features such as truncation below and onlap above the surface, The sequence boundary, therefore, represents a marine regression event, during which continental shelf is partially exposed to subaerial erosion processes.

A seismic sequence is defined as the stratigraphic interval between two consecutive sequence boundaries, representing two marine regression events with a marine transgression event at the middle. Thus a seismic sequence is further subdivided with a basal unit of regressive systems tract, a transgressive systems tract at the middle, and a regressive systems tract at the top. The transgressive systems tract is marked at the top by a maximum flooding surface.

==== Describing Seismic Facies ====
Within a systems tract, each seismic facies is mapped based on reflection geometry, continuity, amplitude, frequency, and interval velocity. The lithology of each facies is then predicted according to known depositional model and nearby drilling results.

==== Estimating Relative Sea level Changes ====
Since onlaps on an erosional surface approximate the positions of sea level on a coastal plain, the sea level variation of a marine transgression/regression cycle could be estimated by the onlap positions on seismic profiles. The maximum sea-level rise is represented by the highest onlap position on a sequence boundary and the minimum sea-level fall by the lowest onlap position on the next younger sequence boundary. The difference in depth between the two positions represents the sea level change magnitude of the cycle.

== See also ==
- Stratigraphy
