= Akata Formation =

Geologic formation in Nigeria

- Stratigraphic range: Eocene-Pliocene
- Type: Geological formation

Lithology
- Primary: Shale

Location
- Location: Atlantic Ocean
- Region: Niger Delta Basin
- Country: Nigeria

Akata Formation is part of the Tertiary Niger Delta (Akata-Agbada) petroleum system located in the Niger Delta Province, of Nigeria at the Gulf of Guinea, Atlantic Ocean.

The upper Akata Formation is cited to be a primary source rock, providing Type II/III kerogen, and a potential target in deep water offshore and possibly beneath currently producing intervals onshore. The clays are typically over-pressured due to the absence of enough porous sediments during compaction and are about 9,000 feet vertical depth below mean sea level.

The Agbada Formation has intervals that contain organic-carbon contents sufficient to be considered good source rocks. The intervals, however, rarely reach thickness sufficient to produce a world-classoil province and are immature in various parts of the delta. The Akata shale is present in large volumes beneath the Agbada Formation and is at least volumetrically sufficient to generate enough oil for a world class oil province such as the Niger Delta. Based on organic-matter content and type.
