= Stress distribution in soil =

Function of the type of soil

Stress distribution in soil is a function of the type of soil, the relative rigidity of the soil and the footing, and the depth of foundation at level of contact between footing and soil. The estimation of vertical stresses at any point in a soil mass due to external loading is essential to the prediction of settlements of buildings, bridges and pressure.
