= Marine flooding surface =

Marine flooding surfaces are a fundamental concept in sequence stratigraphy, where they form the limiting surfaces of parasequences.

A marine flooding surfaces is defined as a sharp contact that separates overlying younger strata with deep-water facies from underlying older strata with shallow-water facies. Therefore, marine flooding surfaces indicate a deepening and can display signs of erosion and/or nondeposition resulting in a hiatus or break in the sedimentary record.
