= Maximum flooding surface =

In sequence stratigraphy, a maximum flooding surface is the surface that marks the transition from a transgression to a regression. Maximum flooding surfaces are abbreviated by mfs, synonyms for them include final transgressive surface, surface of maximum transgression and maximum transgressive surface.

== Facies ==
Maximum flooding surfaces are often associated with deep water facies, which corresponds to the deposition of fine grains in siliciclastic systems. They also tend to display some degree of condensation due to lower deposition rates.
