= Rollover anticlines =

Geological strata

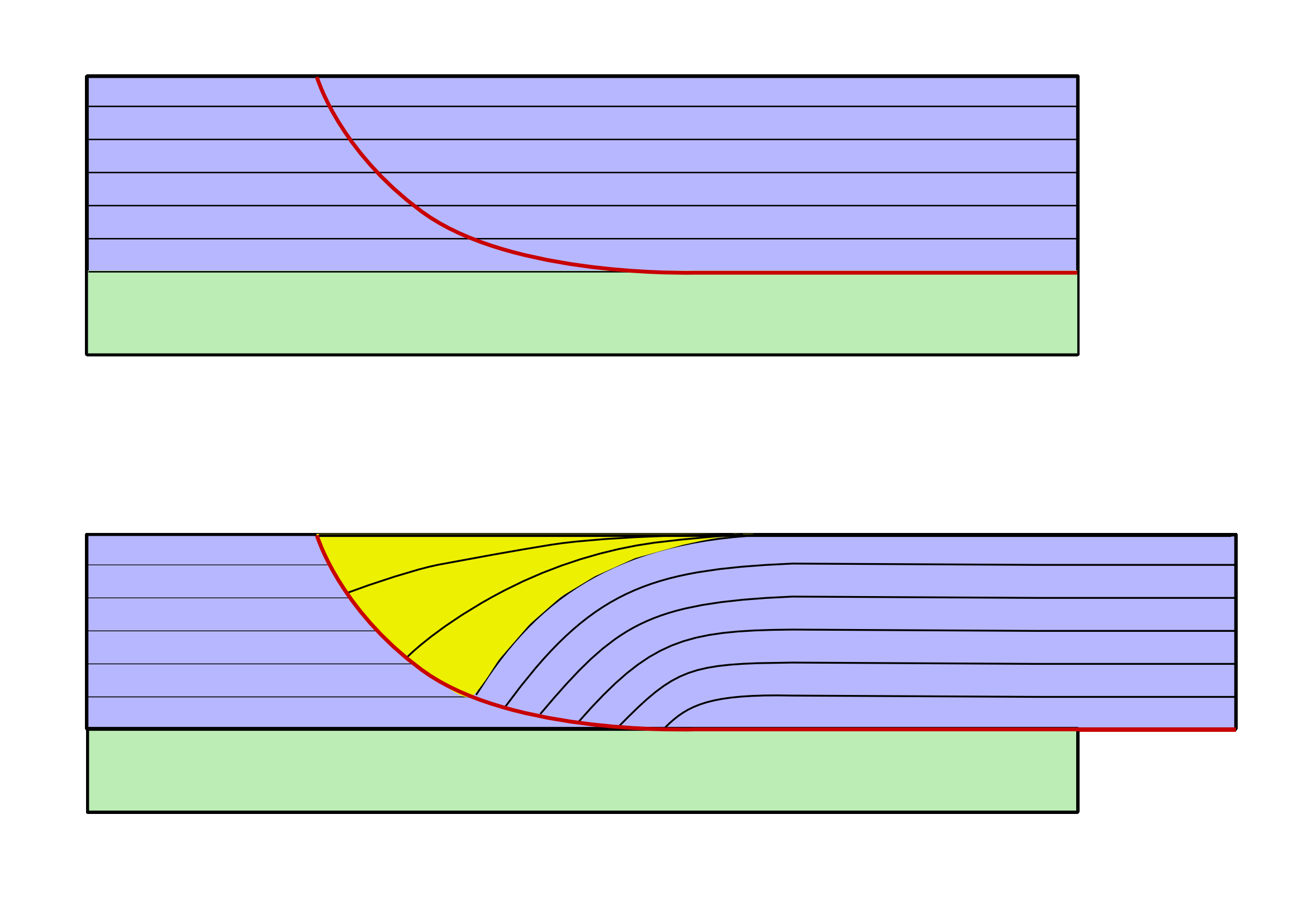
Rollover anticline associated with a listric normal fault

Rollover anticlines are anticlines related to extensional normal faults. They must be differentiated from fault-propagation folds, which are associated with reverse faults.

A rollover anticline is a syn-depositional structure developed within the downthrown block (hanging wall) of large listric normal faults. Such faults are typically regional in nature and develop as a response to extensional collapse of a passive continental margin (i.e. Niger Delta, Mississippi Delta). Their main feature is that they flatten (sole out) with depth. The scale and shape of the anticline is controlled by the geometry of the listric fault plane and the amount of slip that has taken place along it. The actual fold develops when, as the hanging wall is pulled away from the footwall, the hanging wall bends to fill the void that is being formed between the two blocks. The result is an anticline feature in a completely extensional setting.

As rollover anticlines develop during sedimentation, each layer typically shows thickening toward the controlling fault. As the underlying layers bend, they create more accommodation space along the controlling fault versus the crest of the anticline. In the opposite direction, the layers exhibit thinning toward the crest of the rollover anticline.

The crest of a rollover anticline is generally an area of active faulting. The hanging wall experiences flexural bending, which creates extension, which in turn creates normal faults. Two families of hanging-wall faults develop in accordance with Coulomb's law: synthetic (same sense of dip as the controlling fault) and antithetic (opposite sense). They intersect, often creating very complex fault patterns. These tend to be the most complex near the crest of the anticline. Often a collapse graben develops, controlled by localized extension over the outer arc of the culmination.

Rollover structures are often associated by large river deltas, and are favorable traps for hydrocarbons. Trapping is dependent on top seal integrity, and favorable juxtaposition of sandstone reservoirs against impermeable shale across the normal faults that develop within the hanging wall.

== Salt-tectonic rollover anticlines ==
Salt-tectonic rollover anticlines are extensional fold structures that develop above or adjacent to mobile evaporite layers during gravity-driven deformation on passive continental margins. They are significant in petroleum geology because they can form structural traps for hydrocarbons. These structures commonly occur in passive-margin basins containing thick evaporite sequences, such as the Gulf of Mexico, offshore West Africa, and the Santos Basin offshore Brazil. In such settings, differential sediment loading and basinward gravitational spreading cause the salt layer to migrate, producing localized subsidence, growth faulting, and folding in the overburden.

Unlike classical rollover anticlines formed primarily by displacement along listric faults, salt tectonic rollovers are strongly influenced by the flow and evacuation of underlying salt. The geometry of the resulting anticlines depends on the interaction between sedimentation rates, salt mobility, and extensional strain. Low sedimentation rates tend to favor long-lived basinward-dipping rollover systems, whereas high sedimentation rates may promote landward-dipping rollover geometries.
