= Sequence stratigraphy =

Study and analysis of groups of sedimentary deposits

Sequence stratigraphy is a form of stratigraphy that attempts to discern and understand historic geology through time by subdividing and linking sedimentary deposits into unconformity bounded units on a variety of scales. The essence of the method is mapping of strata based on identification of surfaces which are assumed to represent time lines (e.g. subaerial unconformities, maximum flooding surfaces), thereby placing stratigraphy in chronostratigraphic framework allowing understanding of the evolution of the Earth's surface in a particular region through time. Sequence stratigraphy is a useful alternative to a purely lithostratigraphic approach, which emphasizes solely based on the compositional similarity of the lithology of rock units rather than time significance. Unconformities are particularly important in understanding geologic history because they represent erosional surfaces where there is a clear gap in the record. Conversely within a sequence the geologic record should be relatively continuous and complete record that is genetically related.

Stratigraphers explain sequence boundaries and stratigraphic units primarily in terms of changes in relative sea level (the combination of global changes in eustatic sea level and regional subsidence caused by tectonic subsidence, thermal subsidence and load-induced subsidence as the weight of accumulated sediment and water cause isostatic subsidence as a sedimentary basin is filled). The net changes resulting from these vertical forces increases or reduces accommodation space for sediments to accumulate in a sedimentary basin. A secondary influence is the rate of sediment supply to the basin which determines the rate at which that space is filled.

== Historical development ==
The origin of sequence stratigraphy can be traced back to the work of L.L. Sloss on interregional unconformities of the North American craton. Sloss recognized six craton-wide sequences representing hundreds of millions of years of earth history.

In the late 1960s Sloss had several students, notably Peter Vail, Robert Mitchum, and John Sangree, who completed dissertations studying the Pennsylvanian sedimentary rocks of the North American craton and became aware that global changes in sea level could have been responsible for the numerous widespread unconformities in those rocks. During their subsequent careers as research scientists at Exxon's research division Vail, Mitchum and others pioneered the practice of seismic stratigraphy, the stratigraphic interpretation of seismic reflection profiles to understand the layering and packaging of sedimentary rocks in the subsurface using acoustic imaging.

The advent of seismic stratigraphy made it possible to identify sequences representing shorter period of time ranging in duration from tens of thousands to a few million years; and to compare the sequence stratigraphic history around the globe. This in turn led to sequence stratigraphy becoming systematized and understood to have widespread application to stratigraphic study of rock outcrops on the earth's surface as well.

During the 1980s this ushered in a revolution in stratigraphy based on the delineation of regional physical surfaces that separate the sedimentary rock into packages representing discrete and sequential periods of time and predictable patterns of sediment depositional history.

== Significant surfaces ==
=== Sequence boundaries ===
Sequence boundaries are deemed the most significant surfaces. Sequence boundaries are defined as unconformities or their correlative conformities. Sequence boundaries are formed due to the sea level fall. For example, multi-story fluvial sandstone packages often infill incised valleys formed by the sea level drop associated with sequence boundaries. The incised valleys of sequence boundaries correlate laterally with interfluves, palaeosols formed on the margins of incised valleys. The valley infills are not genetically related to underlying depositional systems as previous interpretations thought. There are four criteria distinguishing incised valley fills from other types of multi-story sandstone deposits: a widespread correlation with a regional, high relief erosional surface that is more widespread than the erosional bases of individual channels within the valley; facies associations reflect a basinward shift in facies when compared with underlying units; erosional base of the valley removes preceding systems tracts and marine bands producing a time gap, the removed units will be preserved beneath the interfluves; increasing channel fill and fine grained units upwards or changes in the character of the fluvial systems reflecting increasing accommodation space. Sandstone bodies associated with incised valleys can be good hydrocarbon reservoirs. There have been problems in the correlation and distribution of these bodies. Sequence stratigraphic principles and identification of significant surfaces have resolved some issues.

=== Parasequence boundaries ===
Lesser importance is attached to parasequence boundaries, however, there is a suggestion that flooding surfaces representing parasequence boundaries may be more laterally extensive leaving more evidence than sequence boundaries because the coastal plain has a lower gradient than the inner continental shelf. Parasequence boundaries may be distinguished by differences in physical and chemical properties across the surface such as; formation water salinity, hydrocarbon properties, porosity, compressional velocities and mineralogy. Parasequence boundaries may not form a barrier to hydrocarbon accumulation but may inhibit vertical reservoir communication. After production begins the parasequences act as separate drainage units with the flooding surfaces, which are overlain by shales or carbonate-cemented horizons, forming a barrier to vertical reservoir communications. Sequence stratigraphic principles have optimized production potential once reservoir scale architecture is identified and separate drainage units identified.

== Systems tracts ==
The concept of systems tracts evolved to link the contemporaneous depositional systems. Systems tracts form subdivision in a sequence. Different kinds of systems tracts are assigned on the basis of stratal stacking pattern, position in a sequence, and in the sea level curve and types of bounding surfaces.

- A lowstand systems tract (LST) forms when the rate of sedimentation outpaces the rate of sea level rise during the early stage of the sea level curve. It is bounded by a subaerial unconformity or its correlative conformity at the base and maximum regressive surface at the top.
- A transgressive systems tract (TST) is bounded by maximum regressive surface at the base and maximum flooding surface at the top. This systems tracts forms when the rate of sedimentation is outpaced by the rate of sea level rise in the sea level curves.
- A highstand systems tract (HST) occurs during the late stage of base level rise when the rate of sea level rise drops below the sedimentation rate. In this period of sea level highstand is formed. It is bounded by maximum flooding surface at the base and composite surface at the top.
- Regressive systems tract forms in the marine part of the basin during the base level fall. Subaerial unconformities form in the landward side of the basin at the same time.

== Parasequences and stacking patterns ==
A parasequence is a relatively conformable, genetically related succession of beds and bedsets bounded by marine flooding surfaces and their correlative surfaces. The flooding surfaces bounding parasequences are not of the same scale as the regional transgressive surface that is associated with a sequence boundary.

The parasequences are separated into stacking patterns:

- Aggradational
- Progradational
- Retrogradational

Each stacking pattern will give different information on the behaviour of accommodation space, a major control of which is relative level. So a rapidly progradational pattern will be indicative of falling sea level, rapidly retrogradational is evidence for rapidly transgressing sea level and aggradational will be indicative of gently rising sea level.

== Sea level through geologic time ==
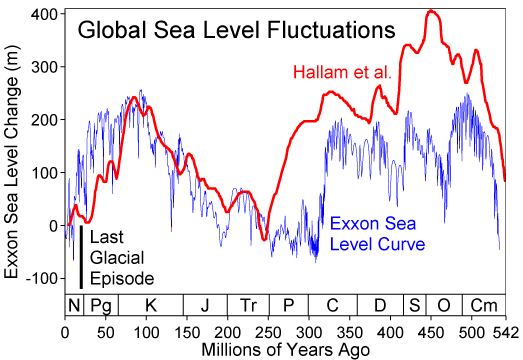
Comparison of two sea level reconstructions during the last 500 Myr. The black bar shows the magnitude of sea level change during the Quaternary glaciations; this is for the past few million years, but the bar is offset further in the past for readability.

Sea level changes over geologic time. The graph on the right illustrates two recent interpretations of sea level changes during the Phanerozoic. The modern age is depicted on the left side, labeled N for Neogene. The blue spikes near date zero represent the sea level changes associated with the most recent glacial period, which reached its maximum extent about 20,000 years Before Present (BP). During this glaciation event, the world's sea level was about 320 feet (98 meters) lower than today, due to the large amount of sea water that had evaporated and been deposited as snow and ice in Northern Hemisphere glaciers. When the world's sea level was at this "low stand", former sea bed sediments were subjected to subaerial weathering (erosion by rain, frost, rivers, etc.) and a new shoreline was established at the new level, sometimes miles basinward of the former shoreline if the sea floor was shallowly inclined.

Today, sea level is at a relative "high stand" within the Quaternary glacial cycles because of rapid end-Pleistocene and early-Holocene deglaciation. The ancient shoreline of the last glacial period is now under approximately 390 feet (120 meters) of water. Although there is debate among earth scientists whether we are currently experiencing a "high stand" it is generally accepted that the eustatic sea level is rising.

In the distant past, sea level has been significantly higher than today. During the Cretaceous (labeled K on the graph), sea level was so high that a seaway extended across the center of North America from Texas to the Arctic Ocean.

These alternating high and low sea level stands repeat at several time scales. The smallest of these cycles is approximately 20,000 years, and corresponds to the rate of precession of the Earth's rotational axis (see Milankovitch cycles) and are commonly referred to as '5th order' cycles. The next larger cycle ('4th order') is about 40,000 years and approximately matches the rate at which the Earth's inclination to the Sun varies (again explained by Milankovitch). The next larger cycle ('3rd order') is about 110,000 years and corresponds to the rate at which the Earth's orbit oscillates from elliptical to circular. Lower order cycles are recognized, which seem to result from plate tectonic events like the opening of new ocean basins by splitting continental masses.

Hundreds of similar glacial cycles have occurred throughout the Earth's history. The earth scientists who study the positions of coastal sediment deposits through time ("sequence stratigraphers") have noted dozens of similar basinward shifts of shorelines associated with a later recovery. The largest of these sedimentary cycles can in some cases be correlated around the world with great confidence.

The three controls on stratigraphic architecture and sedimentary cycle development are:

- Eustatic sea level changes
- Subsidence rate of the basin
- Sediment supply.

Eustatic sea level is the sea level with reference to a fixed point, the centre of the Earth. Relative sea level is measured with reference to the base level, above which erosion can occur and below which deposition can occur. Both eustatic sea level changes and subsidence rates tend to be longer cycles. Sediment supply is largely thought to be controlled by local climatic conditions and can vary rapidly. These variations in local sediment supply affect the local and relative sea level which causes local sedimentary cycles.

Smaller and localised sedimentary cycles are not related to worldwide (eustatic) sea level changes but more to the supply of sediment to the adjacent basins where these sediments are being supplied. For example, when the basinward (oceanward) shift with progradation of shorelines was occurring in the Book Cliffs area of Utah the shorelines were receding or transgressing northwards in Wyoming. These sedimentary cycles are representative of the amount of supply of sediment to the basin. In a transgression, less sediment is being supplied than the rate of increase in the depth of water, and thus the shoreline migrates landward. In a regression, if the water depth is decreasing, the shoreline migrates seaward (basinward) and the previous shoreline is eroded. A regression of the shoreline also occurs if more sediment is being supplied than the shoreline can erode, causing the shoreline to migrate seaward. The latter is called progradation. The cycle of strata deposited during repeated transgressions and regressions creates a depositional sequence.

== Economic significance ==
Sequence stratigraphy is an essential tool of petroleum geology in exploring for oil and gas.

Sequence boundaries have economic significance because these changes in sea level cause large lateral shifts in the depositional patterns of seafloor sediments. These lateral shifts in deposition create alternating layers of good reservoir quality rock (porous and permeable sands) and poorer-quality mudstones (capable of providing a reservoir "seal" to prevent the leakage of any accumulated hydrocarbons that may have migrated into the sandstones). Hydrocarbon prospectors look for places in the world where porous and permeable sands are overlain by low permeability rocks, and where conditions are right for hydrocarbons to be generated and migrate into these "traps".

== See also ==
- Condensed sections – Thin strata that span a large time interval
- Cratonic sequence – Very large-scale lithostratographic sequence
- Cyclostratigraphy – Study of astronomically forced climate cycles within sedimentary successions
- Relative sea level – Sea level measured relative to a land based reference frame
