= Ramón Iribarren =

Spanish civil engineer (1900–1967)

The Most Excellent Ramón Iribarren Cavanilles Doctor-Ingeniero de Caminos, Canales y Puertos
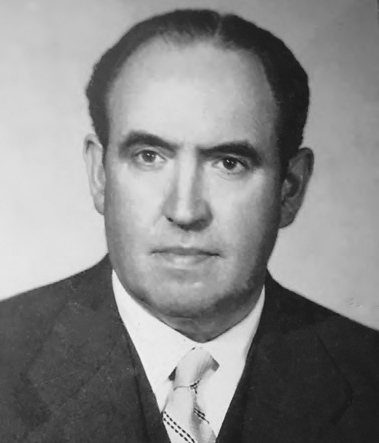
- Ramón Iribarren Cavanilles, c. 1940
- Born: 15 April 1900; Irún, Gipuzkoa, Spain
- Died: 21 February 1967 (aged 66); Madrid, Spain
- Education: Escuela Técnica Superior de Ingenieros de Caminos, Canales y Puertos
- Known for: Iribarren number Method of wave plans Rational formula for rubble mound breakwater stability
- Awards: Civil Order of Alfonso X, the Wise (1959); Order of Civil Merit; Chevalier (Knight) of the Legion of Honour
- Scientific career
- Fields: Civil engineering Hydraulic engineering
- Workplaces: Centro de Estudios y Experimentación de Obras Públicas
- Academic advisors: Eduardo de Castro Pascual
- Notable students: Pedro Suárez Bores

Ramón Luis Anastasio Pascual Iribarren Cavanilles Ing.D (15 April 1900 – 21 February 1967) was a Spanish civil engineer and professor of ports at the School of Civil Engineering (Spanish: Escuela Técnica Superior de Ingenieros de Caminos, Canales y Puertos, ETSICCP) in Madrid. He was chairman of the Spanish delegation to the Permanent International Association of Navigation Congresses and was elected as an academic at the Spanish Royal Academy of Sciences, although he did not take up the latter position. He made notable contributions in the field of coastal engineering, including methods for the calculation of breakwater stability and research which led to the development of the Iribarren number.

He undertook detailed research at several ports in the Bay of Biscay which were subject to extreme waves and frequent storms, and this underpinned much of his early research work. Iribarren recognised that many of the ports in the Bay of Biscay were insufficiently protected from severe wave and storm conditions, which had resulted in a number of shipwrecks and threatened the economic viability of the local fishing community, with whom he enjoyed a close relationship.

In the 1930s, much port and harbour infrastructure design in Spain relied on simply replicating methods used on previous projects, with the guiding principles for the design of new harbour and coastal projects often relying solely on a simple analysis of whether previous construction methods had been successful or not. Iribarren was dissatisfied with such a wholly empirical approach, which he considered did not take into account the effects of location-specific issues such as wave and sediment behaviour, and having identified this as a problem, he spent a number of years developing scientific and mathematical approaches which could be applied to specific cases, based on extensive research and an understanding of wave behaviour and coastal dynamics, in which he made extensive use of observation and photography.

He was instrumental in the development of a research facility for coastal engineering, the first of its kind in Spain. His work achieved international prominence and remains highly relevant, being subject to ongoing development and underpinning several contemporary design methods used in coastal engineering and coastal protection works.

Spilling breaker.

Plunging breaker.

Collapsing breaker.

Surging breaker.

Types of breaking waves as researched by Iribarren.

== Life and career ==
=== Education and early work ===
Iribarren was born in Irún in 1900, the son of Plácido José Iribarren Aldaz, a wealthy businessman with properties in Cuba, and Teresa Cavanilles Sanz. The eldest of three brothers, he initially studied at the San Luis school in his hometown, where he excelled as a student of mathematics. After completing a baccalaureate at the Instituto de Peñaflorida high school in San Sebastián, he left for Madrid to study exact science, but changed his course in 1921 and began studying civil engineering, graduating in 1927 as the best-placed student on the course. Upon graduation, he initially worked for the Ministry of Public Works at the regional Catalonian roads department in Girona.

=== The Guipuzkoan ports, Mutriku and The Iribarren Number ===
Iribarren was transferred from Girona to his home province of Gipuzkoa in 1929, where he was appointed Chief Engineer of the Gipuzkoan Ports Group at the Ministry of Public Works, with an office in San Sebastián. In this role he was responsible for the ports of Deba, Isla de los Faisanes, Orio, Getaria, Mutriku, San Sebastián and Zumaia, along with overseeing the design and execution of several port and harbour projects. The role provided Iribarren with the opportunity to make detailed observations of the Gipuzkoan coastline, which informed his theories and research output. He undertook research into several aspects of breakwater and wave behaviour at each of the ports under his control, as well as the general Gipuzkoan coastline and Bay of Biscay.

Iribarren undertook extensive research at the Port of Mutriku, where he was responsible for the design and construction of a breakwater to the outer harbour in 1932. The works mitigated the approach and entry difficulties for shipping at the outer harbour area, but Iribarren observed that the existing vertical sea walls of the inner harbour were still causing significant wave reflection, leading to dangerous berthing conditions for ships once inside the mouth of the harbour. Despite initial opposition from the local fishing community, he was successful in implementing a sloping breakwater at the inner harbour in 1936, which ended the problems caused by reflection and made safe berthing of ships possible.

The work at Mutriku provided Iribarren with the opportunity to develop his fundamental theories around refraction, allowing him the time and environment in which to research and observe his theoretical approximations of wave direction and wave characteristics from available depth contours. He published papers on his work at Mutriku in 1932 and 1936, and this work led to the development of a dimensionless parameter for waves breaking on a slope, which was further developed by Jurjen Battjes in 1974 and is known as the Iribarren number or Iribarren parameter.

The importance of this parameter for so many aspects of waves breaking on slopes appears to justify that it be given a special name. In the author's opinion it is appropriate to call it the "Iribarren number" (denoted by "Ir"), in honor of the man who introduced it and who has made many other valuable contributions to our knowledge of water waves.

— Jurjen A. Battjes, "Surf Similarity", Proceedings of the 14th International Conference on Coastal Engineering (1974)

=== Works at the Bidasoa River ===
In 1934, the City Council of Hondarribia approached Iribarren to investigate problems related to sediment transport and erosion at the Hondarribia Bar at the mouth of the Bidasoa River on the Spanish border with France, and proposed the construction of a breakwater. A budget of 3,000 pesetas was approved to construct a small trial section of breakwater. Recognising the complicated nature of the interaction between wave behaviour and sediment, and the need to design an effective solution, Iribarren spent a number of years studying the waves and coastal morphodynamics in Hondarribia to understand the relevant boundary conditions and prepare an effective design. He published his findings in 1941, and although his plans were supported by the Ministry of Public Works, they were met with opposition from the City Council and the project was not approved.

Meanwhile, Iribarren was approached by the French authorities to prepare a design for similar works across the river in the town of Hendaye. After completing a design in 1945, he supervised the construction of the Hendaye breakwater which commenced in October 1946. The project was a major success and in 1949, seeing the results of Iribarren's work in Hendaye, the City Council in Hondarribia approved the construction of a breakwater to his design. Iribarren supervised construction which commenced on 7 September 1949, with the works completed in 1955 at a cost of 18 million pesetas. He made changes through an iterative design process as construction progressed, with the final breakwater being 1,100 metres in length, 40 metres wide at the base and using 300,000 tonnes of armourstone from a quarry in Jaizkibel. The project was a success, solving the erosion problems, increasing navigation safety and creating a large recreational beach.

=== Professorship, establishment of the Ports Laboratory and international work ===
Iribarren was appointed as professor at the ETSICCP in 1939, filling the vacancy left by the death of Eduardo de Castro Pascual during the Spanish Civil War in 1937. Iribarren promoted the idea of establishing a Spanish centre for the study of coastal engineering and harbour works, modelled on research facilities in universities such as Technische Universität Berlin and ETH Zurich. This was achieved in 1948 with the creation of the Ports Laboratory (Spanish: Laboratorio de Puertos) in Madrid, with Iribarren as Director. In 1957 the laboratory became part of the Centro de Estudios y Experimentación de Obras Públicas.

He was involved in a number of notable Spanish and international civil engineering projects throughout his career. Notable projects included San Sebastián Airport, the breakwater at the port of Palma de Mallorca, major works at the Port of Cadiz, the port of Melilla in 1944, the canalisation of the Untxin, the oil terminal of Luanda in 1956 and coastal engineering works in the Gulf of Sirte, Cartagena de Indias, and Venezuela. Between 1960 and 1961, he was commissioned by the Government of Spain to work alongside a French delegation in Paris to undertake studies for railway and port infrastructure at Villa Cisneros to transport iron ore mined in the Spanish Sahara.

=== The Port of Palma de Mallorca and the Wave Diagram Method ===
Iribarren's approach to the study of wave behaviour for the works at the outer breakwater of the Port of Palma de Mallorca was used as the basis for several harbour projects across Spain after he published his método del diagrama de ondas or método de los planos de oleaje (wave diagram method / method of wave plans) in 1941. Building on research which he had commenced at Mutriku in 1932, the work was subsequently translated and published in English, Portuguese and French. Iribarren noted that the orientation of the Port of Palma meant that it would only be exposed to storms whose direction varied from Southwest to Southeast. He therefore studied these two extreme storms and their midpoint (the south), and designed the breakwater accordingly.

He used a similar approach on many other projects, including improvements at Hondarribia and A Coruña. Iribarren noted that his method was an approximation, albeit one which represented a significant advance on previous design techniques. Unlike existing approaches, his method was grounded in the principles of using the results of fundamental research to devise solutions to a practical problem.

Iribarren's approach was not to design by intuition or simplified empirical comparisons with previous projects, as was the case in Spain up until the 1930s, but rather to research and determine the nature of wave propagation towards a specific coastline and assess wave characteristics and bathymetry, along with detailed analysis of the shape and orientation of the coastline or harbour under consideration.

He used as a starting point the existing theory of trochoidal waves, assuming circular orbital motion for liquid molecules in a body of water agitated by swell at infinite depth, and elliptical motion for those at reduced depths. Iribarren took into account shoaling, and the modifications which waves undergo approaching the coast as they enter shallow water, which he defined as a point where water depth $H$ is equal to or less than half the original wavelength, $L_o$.

Iribarren noted that detailed observation and the production of graphical records of wave and sediment behaviour were necessary to correlate, and if necessary modify, the theoretical approximations used in his method, as he had himself done at Palma de Mallorca. He continuously refined and developed his methods and the associated mathematics. By 1954, with further iterations and adjustments made and the method successfully implemented on a number of projects across Spain and internationally, he considered that the wave diagram method was sufficiently developed for use in most practical cases.

=== Iribarren's formula for the design of breakwaters ===
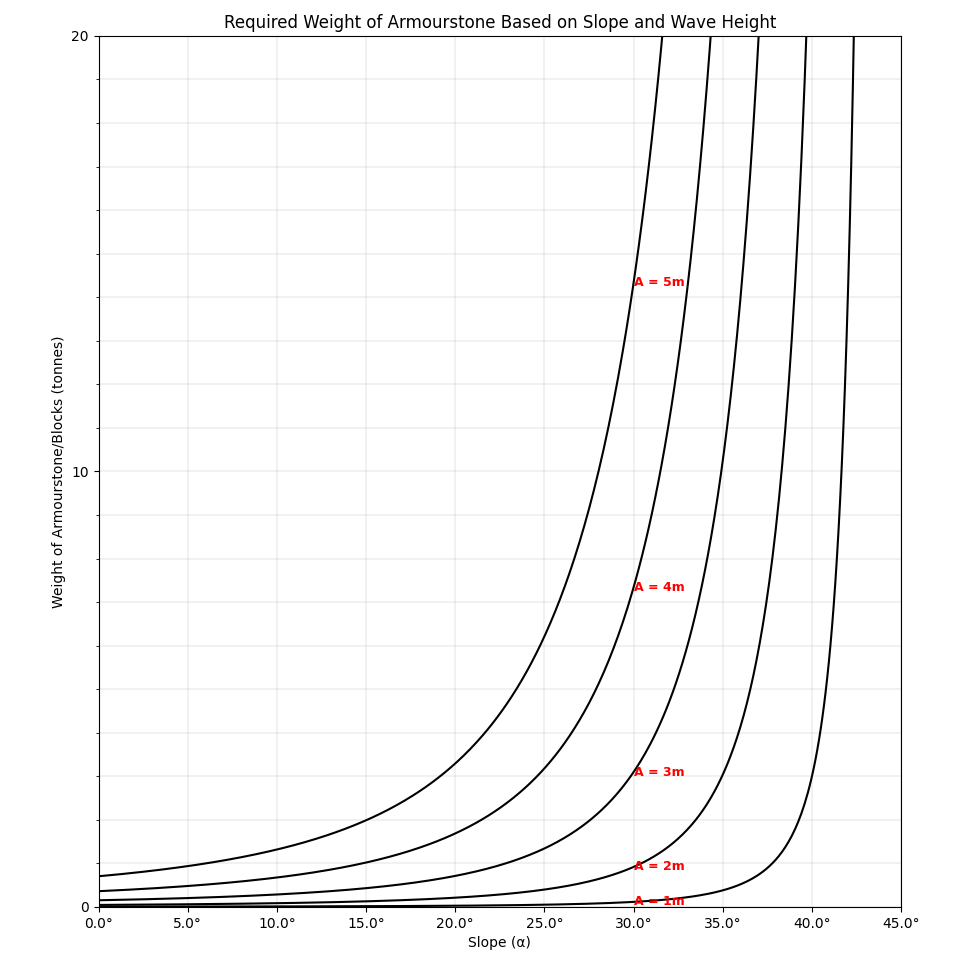
Graph illustrating the required weight of armourstone (in tonnes) against the slope (α) of a breakwater. The relationship is governed by the Iribarren formula: $P = \frac{N \times A^3 \times d}{(\cos(\alpha) - \sin(\alpha))^3 \times (d - 1)^3}$ The weight of the armourstone is proportionally related to the cube of the wave height, emphasising the significant increase in stone weight as wave height increases.

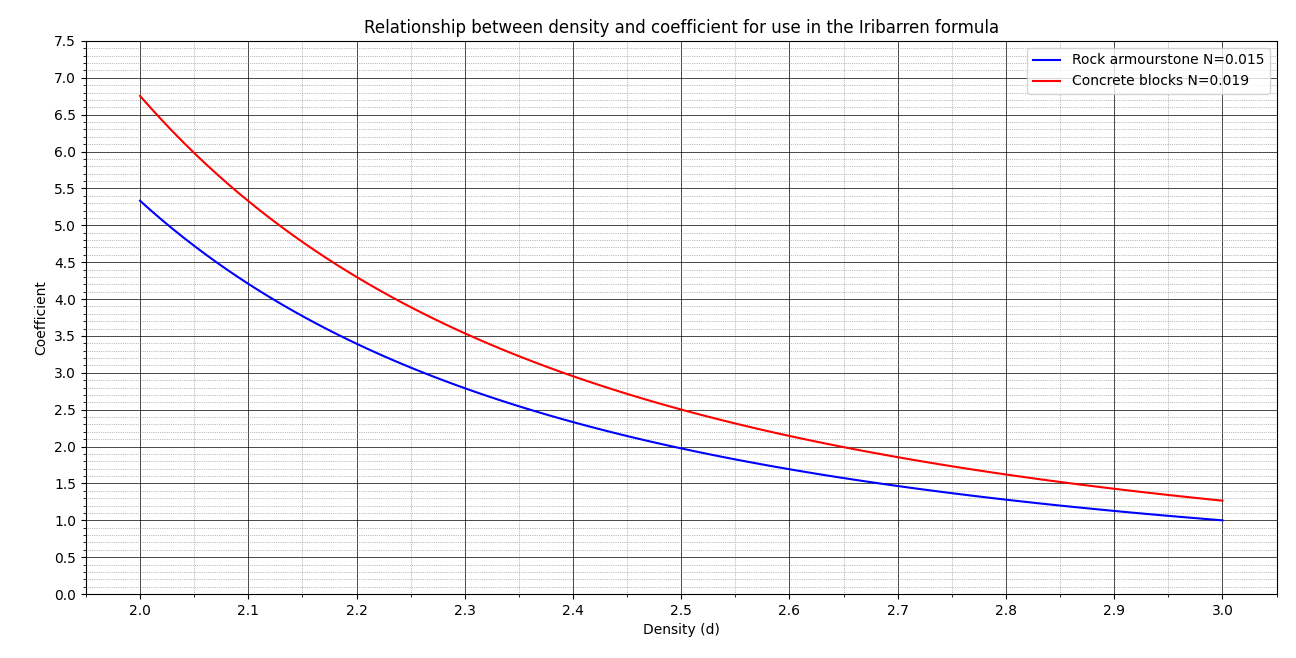
Graph showing the relationship between density $d$ and coefficient for use in the Iribarren formula. The curves represent coefficients calculated for Rock armourstone $N=0.015$ and Concrete blocks $N=0.019$.

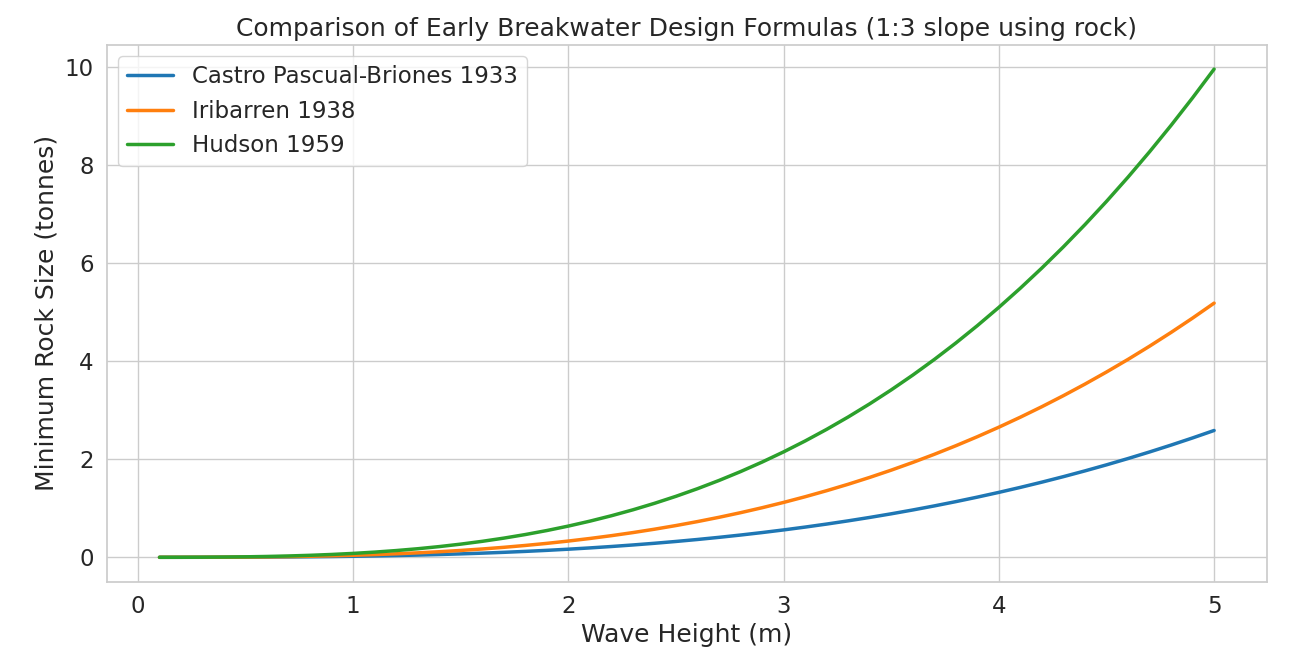
Graph comparing results using early breakwater formulas (Castro Pascual-Briones, Iribarren and Hudson) for a 1:3 slope using 2.6t/m3 rock

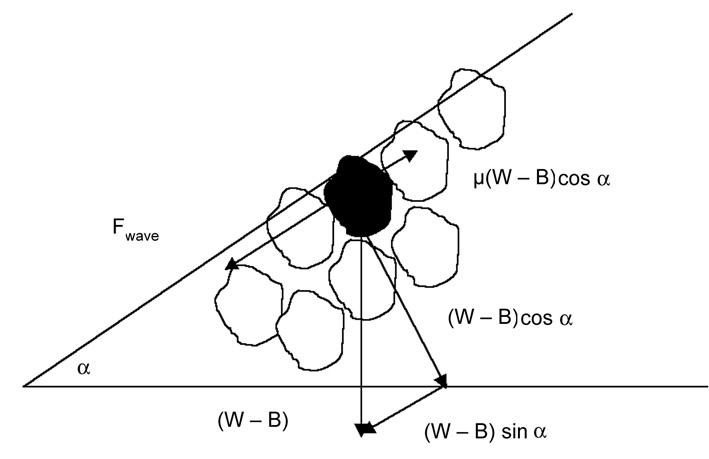
Equilibrium of loose rock in a breakwater, as the basis for stability analysis in the Iribarren formula

Iribarren had studied under Eduardo de Castro Pascal, who in 1933 proposed a formula for the design of breakwaters which he had developed based on earlier work by Briones. The De Castro Pascual-Briones (1933) formula is:

$P(T+1)^2 \sqrt{T - \frac{2}{\delta}} = 704A^3 \cdot \frac{\delta}{(\delta - 1)^3}$

in which:

- $P$ is the weight of the armourstone;
- $T$ is the slope of the armourstone (or, more precisely, the cosine of the angle the slope makes with the horizontal when the sine is taken as unity);
- $\delta$ is the density of the stone relative to that of water, and;
- $A$ is the wave height.

De Castro's formula implies that for $T = \infty$, $P$ should be zero; which means that when the slope is almost horizontal, even very light armour units can be used.

If $T$ is less than $\frac{2}{\delta}$, $P$ has an imaginary value, indicating that for very steep slopes, a breakwater or dike cannot be successfully constructed no matter how large the armourstone is. If δ is given a negative value, which is unacceptable, it results in an inadmissible value for $P$.

With de Castro Pascual's encouragement, Iribarren began to develop and research the formula further. Iribarren developed his own formula for the stability of breakwater slopes under wave attack, publishing a paper on the subject in 1938. However, the political situation in Spain and international attitudes to scientific co-operation with the Franco dictatorship restricted the dissemination of Iribarren's work, which led to more common international adoption of a similar method which had been developed by Robert Y. Hudson at the USACE Waterways Experiment Station (WES) in Vicksburg, Mississippi, known as Hudson's equation. Iribarren's 1938 paper included the following formula, which calculated the weight of the armourstone or wave-dissipating concrete block required:

$$P = \frac{N \times A^3 \times d}{{(\cos(\alpha) - \sin(\alpha))^3 \times (d - 1)^3}}$$

Where:

- $P$ represents the weight of the stones in tonnes.
- $A$ is the total wave height that impacts the breakwater, measured in metres.
- $d$ is the relative density of the stone or block material.
- $\alpha$ is the angle (measured from the horizontal) of the breakwater slope.
- $N$ is a coefficient, with 0.015 used for natural rubble mound breakwaters and 0.019 for artificial block breakwaters.

In this formula, the mass of the armourstone is proportional to the cube of the wave height, suggesting that a doubling of wave height necessitates an eightfold increase in stone weight. This relationship, while seeming substantial, is logical as the linear dimension of the stone (with constant density and slope) is proportional to wave height.

From the formula, Iribarren deduced that natural rubble offers advantages over its artificial counterpart, and he highlighted the significance of the material's density in breakwater design, whilst noting that the decision between natural and artificial materials often rests upon the availability of suitable quarry materials and an economic evaluation of the costs associated with each type for the given design profile.

Notably, the derived formula only permits slopes up to the natural limit of $\alpha = 45^\circ$. Slopes exceeding this would yield a negative value for $P$, which is impractical. At the limit of $\alpha = 45^\circ$, even with a minimal wave height ($A$), the formula indicates infinite values for $P$. This implies that any size of stone on a breakwater with its natural slope could theoretically be dislodged by the slightest wave. Additionally, when $\alpha = 45^\circ$ and $A = 0$ in the formula, $P$ becomes zero, logically indicating that if waves are negligible, a natural slope breakwater consisting of stones of any size is in perfect equilibrium.

Iribarren continued to develop and refine this formula and his work on breakwater stability over the years, and in 1965 he published an improved version of the formula based on his ongoing research:

$$P = \frac{N \times A^3 \times d}{{(f \times \cos \alpha - \sin \alpha)^3 \times (d - 1)^3}}$$

This improvement includes a friction coefficient, $f$, and was a result of research and experiments by Iribarren and his colleagues during the period between the first (1938) and final (1965) publication of the Iribarren formula. He had undertaken wave flume experiments and research into factors including the type of wave breaking, wave run-up and run-down, friction and interlocking between units, and the types of failure possible in breakwaters in the intervening period. Iribarren proposed that the force of a wave can be approximated by:

$$F_{wave}=\rho_w g d_{n50}^2H$$

By then analysing the balance of forces for the rock or artificial element in question, the required minimum stone weight for stability could be determined both during wave run-up and wave run-down. The stability formula is then applied as follows:

for breakwater stability during wave run-up:
$$W\geq\frac{N\rho_s gH^3}{\Delta^3(\mu\cos\alpha-\sin\alpha)^3}$$

for stability during wave run-down:
$$W\geq\frac{N\rho_s gH^3}{\Delta^3(\mu\cos\alpha+\sin\alpha)^3}$$

in which:

W = stone weight in kilogrammes
H = Wave height at the toe of the structure
Δ = relative density of the stone (= (ρ_{s} -ρ_{w})/ρ_{w}') where ρ_{s} is the density of the rock or armour unit and ρ_{w} is the density of the water
d_{n50} = nominal stone diameter
α = slope gradient
N = a stability number
μ = a friction factor
g = the acceleration due to gravity.

Iribarren suggested that μ is around 2.4, N for wave run-down is 0.43, and for run-up it is around 0.85.

The key difference between the Iribarren formula and the de Castro Pascual-Briones formula is the consideration of friction in the slope factor by Iribarren, with the de Castro Pascual-Briones slope factor including only a density term. For breakwater slopes steeper than 1:2, the formulae of Hudson and Iribarren produce similar results, but for more gentle slopes the Hudson formula is inaccurate and indicates that stability becomes infinite, which is invalid. Hudson's formula relied on a $cot\alpha$ relationship between the wave height and the slope angle, $\alpha$, whilst Iribarren demonstrated that a $cos \alpha$ relation is correct for gentle slopes.

Iribarren presented his final publication on the subject for debate at the PIANC Conference of 1965 in Stockholm, however Hudson did not attend this conference and there was consequently no public discussion between the authors. Modern design relies on the Van der Meer formula or similar variants. Despite Iribarren's demonstration of its shortcomings, the Hudson formula continued to be used widely in its original 1959 iteration until the 1970s. A modified version of the Hudson formula is still commonly used for concrete breakwater elements, but for rock armour structures, it is valid only for situations with a permeable core and steep waves. It is also not possible to estimate the degree of damage on a breakwater during a storm with the Hudson formula.

=== International recognition and publication of Obras Maritimas ===
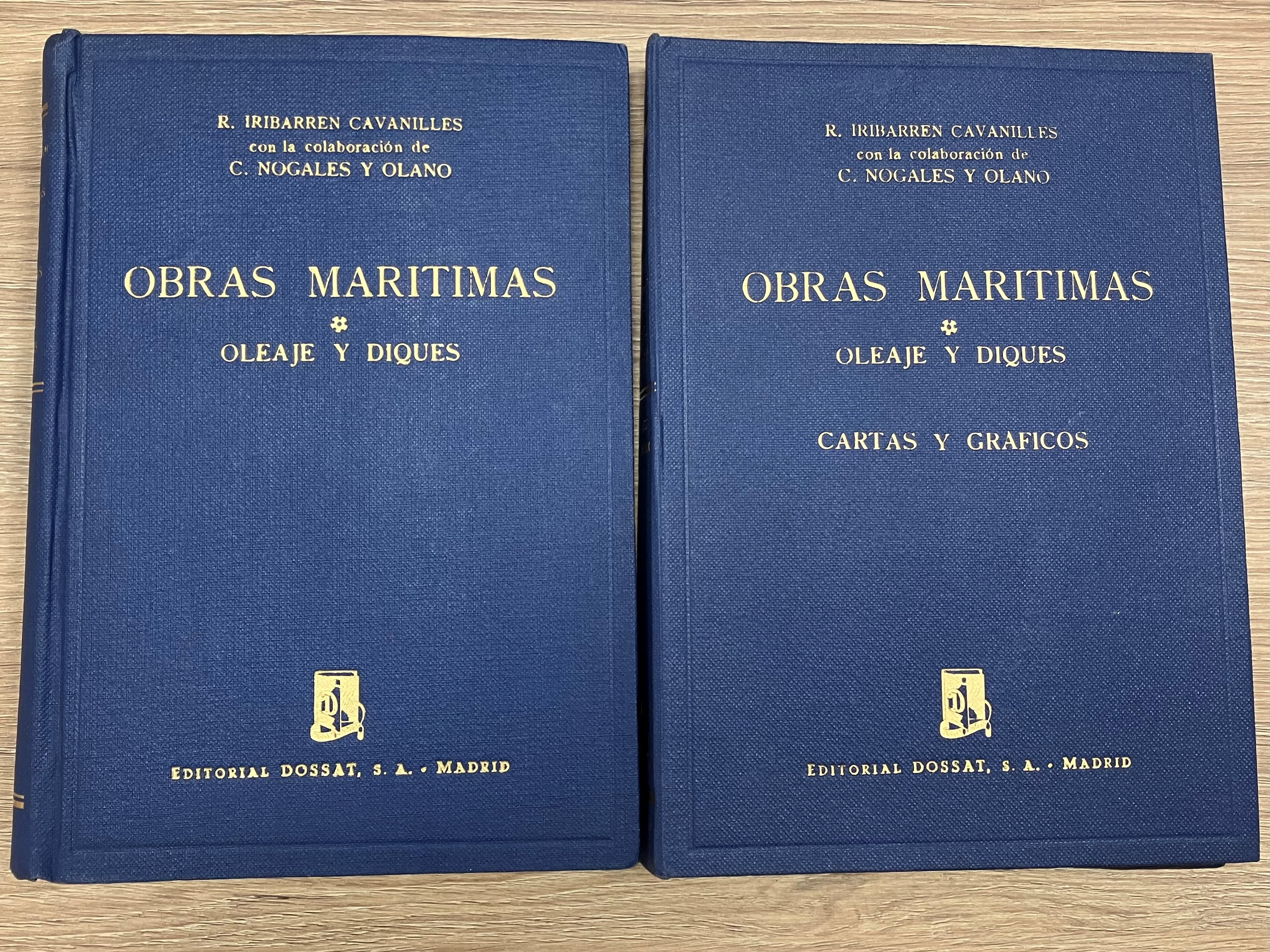
Iribarren collaborated with Casto Nogales y Olano in the publication of the two-volume textbook Obras maritimas: Oleaje y diques in 1954

Iribarren obtained a level of international recognition as chair of the Spanish delegation to PIANC, and in addition to his address at the 1965 event, he presented his research work at the PIANC international congresses in Lisbon, Rome and London (congresses XVII to XIX). Beginning in the late 1940s, he was invited to the United States by the engineering schools of The University of California, Berkeley and Massachusetts Institute of Technology, where he delivered several lectures.

He presented his research to the Beach Erosion Board of the United States Army Corps of Engineers, a body which subsequently organised the translation and publication of much of the research work Iribarren undertook with his long-term collaborator and fellow Spanish engineer Casto Nogales y Olano (1908–1985), with whom Iribarren also collaborated on a two-volume engineering textbook entitled Maritime works: Waves and dikes (Spanish: Obras maritimas: Oleaje y diques) which was first published in 1954, with a second edition in 1964.

=== Personal life ===
Iribarren married Maria Hiriart, a French national, in 1939. He was the eldest of three brothers, one of whom, Luis Iribarren Cavanilles (19 February 1902 – 4 May 1984), was a dentist who served as manager of the Spain national football team in four matches between 1953 and 1954, and played football for both Real Unión and Real Sociedad Gimnástica Española. His second brother, José Iribarren Cavanilles, was the municipal architect in Irún.

In February 1967, Iribarren died as the result of a fire whilst driving in a Fiat 1500 on the main Valencia-Madrid motorway, near Vallecas. An inscribed watch, gifted to him by a federation of fishermen in Gipuzkoa, was used to identify him.

== Legacy and recognition ==
Iribarren had a highly theoretical approach grounded in detailed observation and assisted by experiment, and his work continues to underpin several coastal engineering design methods. His findings have been further developed by modern research, including contemporary design methods such as the van der Meer formula, which expands Iribarren's methods to include allowance for irregular waves and the influence of storm duration.

He was honoured by the governments of Spain and France with the awards of Civil Order of Alfonso X, the Wise in 1959, The Order of Civil Merit, Chevalier (Knight) of the Legion of Honour and was elected as a member of the École navale. He was named an adopted son of Hondarribia for his work on the Bidasoa breakwater and the associated beach nourishment works there.

A bronze bust of Iribarren by the Spanish sculptor José Pérez Pérez "Peresejo" stands at the location of the Bidasoa works, erected there in 1969. A bust of Iribarren is also displayed in the Centro de Estudios y Experimentación de Obras Públicas building in Madrid. A street in Irún (Ramón Iribarren Kalea), and a promenade in Hondarribia (Ramón Iribarren Pasealekua Ibilbidea), are named after Iribarren. In 2017, a conference was held at the Institute of Engineering of Spain (Instituto de la Ingeniería de España, IIE) to commemorate the fiftieth anniversary of Iribarren's passing.
