= List of ISO standards 24000–25999 =

This is a list of published (Note: This list generally excludes draft versions.) International Organization for Standardization (ISO) standards and other deliverables. (Note: ISO deliverables include "specifications" (ISO/PAS, ISO/TS), "reports" (ISO/TR), etc, which are not referred to by ISO as "standards".) For a complete and up-to-date list of all the ISO standards, see the ISO catalogue.

The standards are protected by copyright and most of them must be purchased. However, about 300 of the standards produced by ISO and IEC's Joint Technical Committee 1 (JTC 1) have been made freely and publicly available.

== ISO 24000 – ISO 24999 ==
- ISO 24013:2006 Optics and photonics – Lasers and laser-related equipment – Measurement of phase retardation of optical components for polarized laser radiation
- ISO 24014 Public transport – Interoperable fare management system
  - ISO 24014-1:2015 Part 1: Architecture
  - ISO/TR 24014-2:2013 Part 2: Business practices
  - ISO/TR 24014-3:2013 Part 3: Complementary concepts to Part 1 for multi-application media
- ISO 24097 Intelligent transport systems – Using web services (machine-machine delivery) for ITS service delivery
  - ISO 24097-1:2017 Part 1: Realization of interoperable web services
  - ISO/TR 24097-2:2015 Part 2: Elaboration of interoperable web services' interfaces
- ISO/TR 24098:2007 Intelligent transport systems – System architecture, taxonomy and terminology – Procedures for developing ITS deployment plans utilizing ITS system architecture
- ISO 24099:2011 Navigation data delivery structures and protocols
- ISO 24100:2010 Intelligent transport systems – Basic principles for personal data protection in probe vehicle information services
- ISO 24101 Intelligent transport systems – Communications access for land mobiles (CALM) – Application management
  - ISO 24101-1:2008 Part 1: General requirements
  - ISO 24101-2:2010 Part 2: Conformance test
- ISO 24102 Intelligent transport systems – Communications access for land mobiles (CALM) – ITS station management
  - ISO 24102-1:2013 Part 1: Local management
  - ISO 24102-2:2015 Part 2: Remote management of ITS-SCUs
  - ISO 24102-3:2013 Part 3: Service access points
  - ISO 24102-4:2013 Part 4: Station-internal management communications
  - ISO 24102-5:2013 Part 5: Fast service advertisement protocol (FSAP)
- ISO 24103:2009 Intelligent transport systems – Communications access for land mobiles (CALM) – Media adapted interface layer (MAIL)
- ISO 24113: the top-level standard for the (voluntary) mitigation of orbital space debris
- ISO 24153:2009 Random sampling and randomization procedures
- ISO 24155:2016 Hydrometry – Hydrometric data transmission systems – Specification of system requirements
- ISO 24156 Graphic notations for concept modelling in terminology work and its relationship with UML
  - ISO 24156-1:2014 Part 1: Guidelines for using UML notation in terminology work
- ISO 24157:2008 Ophthalmic optics and instruments – Reporting aberrations of the human eye
- ISO 24294:2013 Timber – Round and sawn timber – Vocabulary
- ISO/TS 24348:2014 Ophthalmic optics – Spectacle frames – Method for the simulation of wear and detection of nickel release from metal and combination spectacle frames
- ISO 24393:2008 Rolling bearings - Linear motion rolling bearings - Vocabulary
- ISO 24408:2005 Ships and marine technology - Position-indicating lights for life-saving appliances - Testing, inspection and marking of production units
- ISO 24409 Ships and marine technology - Design, location and use of shipboard safety signs, safety-related signs, safety notices and safety markings
  - ISO 24409-1:2010 Part 1: Design principles
  - ISO 24409-2:2014 Part 2: Catalogue
  - ISO 24409-3:2014 Part 3: Code of practice
- ISO 24497 Non-destructive testing - Metal magnetic memory
  - ISO 24497-1:2007 Part 1: Vocabulary
- ISO 24502:2010 Ergonomics - Accessible design - Specification of age-related luminance contrast for coloured light
- ISO 24503:2011 Ergonomics - Accessible design - Tactile dots and bars on consumer products
- ISO 24510:2007 Activities relating to drinking water and wastewater services – Guidelines for the assessment and for the improvement of the service to users
- ISO 24517 Document management - Engineering document format using PDF
  - ISO 24517-1:2008 Part 1: Use of PDF 1.6 (PDF/E-1)
- ISO 24518:2015 Activities relating to drinking water and wastewater services – Crisis management of water utilities
- ISO/TS 24520:2017 Service activities relating to drinking water supply systems and wastewater systems – Crisis management – Good practice for technical aspects
- ISO 24521:2016 Activities relating to drinking water and wastewater services – Guidelines for the management of basic on-site domestic wastewater services
- ISO 24523:2017 Service activities relating to drinking water supply systems and wastewater systems – Guidelines for benchmarking of water utilities
- ISO/TR 24529:2008 Intelligent transport systems – Systems architecture – Use of unified modelling language (UML) in ITS International Standards and deliverables
- ISO/TS 24530 Traffic and Travel Information (TTI) – TTI via Transport Protocol Experts Group (TPEG) Extensible Markup Language (XML)
  - ISO/TS 24530-1:2006 Part 1: Introduction, common data types and tpegML
  - ISO/TS 24530-2:2006 Part 2: tpeg-locML
  - ISO/TS 24530-3:2006 Part 3: tpeg-rtmML
  - ISO/TS 24530-4:2006 Part 4: tpeg-ptiML
- ISO 24531:2013 Intelligent transport systems – System architecture, taxonomy and terminology – Using XML in ITS standards, data registries and data dictionaries
- ISO/TR 24532:2006 Intelligent transport systems – Systems architecture, taxonomy and terminology – Using CORBA (Common Object Request Broker Architecture) in ITS standards, data registries and data dictionaries
- ISO/TS 24533:2012 Intelligent transport systems – Electronic information exchange to facilitate the movement of freight and its intermodal transfer – Road transport information exchange methodology
- ISO 24534 Intelligent transport systems – Automatic vehicle and equipment identification – Electronic registration identification (ERI) for vehicles (Note: The exact wording of this title varies between parts. This is the wording of the most recently published part.)
  - ISO 24534-1:2010 Part 1: Architecture
  - ISO 24534-2:2010 Part 2: Operational requirements
  - ISO 24534-3:2016 Part 3: Vehicle data
  - ISO 24534-4:2010 Part 4: Secure communications using asymmetrical techniques
  - ISO 24534-5:2011 Part 5: Secure communications using symmetrical techniques
- ISO 24535:2007 Intelligent transport systems – Automatic vehicle identification – Basic electronic registration identification (Basic ERI)
- ISO/IEC 24570:2005 Software engineering - NESMA functional size measurement method version 2.1 - Definitions and counting guidelines for the application of Function Point Analysis
- ISO/TR 24578:2012 Hydrometry – Acoustic Doppler profiler – Method and application for measurement of flow in open channels
- ISO 24610 Language resource management - Feature structures
  - ISO 24610-1:2006 Part 1: Feature structure representation
  - ISO 24610-2:2011 Part 2: Feature system declaration
- ISO 24611:2012 Language resource management - Morpho-syntactic annotation framework (MAF)
- ISO 24612:2012 Language resource management - Linguistic annotation framework (LAF)
- ISO 24613:2008 Language resource management - Lexical markup framework (LMF)
  - ISO 24613-1:2019 Part 1: Core model
  - ISO 24613-2:2020 Part 2: Machine-readable dictionary (MRD) model
- ISO 24614 Language resource management - Word segmentation of written texts
  - ISO 24614-1:2010 Part 1: Basic concepts and general principles
  - ISO 24614-2:2011 Part 2: Word segmentation for Chinese, Japanese and Korean
- ISO 24615 Language resource management — Syntactic annotation framework (SynAF)
  - ISO 24615-1:2014 Part 1: Syntactic model
  - ISO 24615-2:2018 Part 2: XML serialization (Tiger vocabulary)
- ISO 24616:2012 Language resources management - Multilingual information framework
- ISO 24617 Language resource management — Semantic annotation framework (SemAF)
  - ISO 24617-1:2012 Part 1: Time and events (SemAF-Time, ISO-TimeML)
  - ISO 24617-2:2020 Part 2: Part 2: Dialogue acts
  - ISO 24617-4:2014 Part 4: Semantic roles (SemAF-SR)
  - ISO/TS 24617-5:2014 Part 5: Discourse structure (SemAF-DS)
  - ISO 24617-6:2016 Part 6: Principles of semantic annotation (SemAF Principles)
  - ISO 24617-7:2020 Part 7: Spatial information (ISOspace)
  - ISO 24617-8:2016 Part 8: Semantic relations in discourse, core annotation schema (DR-core)
  - ISO 24617-9:2019 Part 9: Reference annotation framework (RAF)
- ISO 24619:2011 Language resource management - Persistent identification and sustainable access (PISA)
- ISO/TS 24620 Language resource management - Controlled natural language (CNL)
  - ISO/TS 24620-1:2015 Part 1: Basic concepts and principles
- ISO 24622 Language resource management - Component Metadata Infrastructure (CMDI)
  - ISO 24622-1:2015 Part 1: The Component Metadata Model
- ISO 24623 Language resource management — Corpus query lingua franca (CQLF)
  - ISO 24623-1:2018 Part 1: Metamodel
- ISO 24624:2016 Language resource management - Transcription of spoken language
- ISO/IEC 24700:2005 Quality and performance of office equipment that contains reused components
- ISO/IEC 24702:2006 Information technology - Generic cabling - Industrial premises
- ISO/IEC 24703:2004 Information technology - Participant Identifiers
- ISO/IEC TR 24704:2004 Information technology - Customer premises cabling for wireless access points
- ISO/IEC 24707:2018 Information technology – Common Logic (CL) – A framework for a family of logic-based languages
- ISO/IEC 24708:2008 Information technology – Biometrics – BioAPI Interworking Protocol
- ISO/IEC 24709 Information technology – Conformance testing for the biometric application programming interface (BioAPI)
  - ISO/IEC 24709-1:2007 Part 1: Methods and procedures
  - ISO/IEC 24709-2:2007 Part 2: Test assertions for biometric service providers
  - ISO/IEC 24709-3:2011 Part 3: Test assertions for BioAPI frameworks
- ISO/IEC TR 24710:2005 Information technology - Radio frequency identification for item management - Elementary tag licence plate functionality for ISO/IEC 18000 air interface definitions
- ISO/IEC 24713 Information technology – Biometric profiles for interoperability and data interchange
  - ISO/IEC 24713-1:2008 Part 1: Overview of biometric systems and biometric profiles
  - ISO/IEC 24713-2:2008 Part 2: Physical access control for employees at airports
  - ISO/IEC 24713-3:2009 Part 3: Biometrics-based verification and identification of seafarers
- ISO/IEC TR 24714 Information technology - Biometrics - Jurisdictional and societal considerations for commercial applications
  - ISO/IEC TR 24714-1:2008 Part 1: General guidance
- ISO/IEC TR 24715:2006 Information technology - Programming languages, their environments and system software interfaces - Technical Report on the Conflicts between the ISO/IEC 9945 (POSIX) and the Linux Standard Base (ISO/IEC 23360)
- ISO/IEC TR 24716:2007 Information technology - Programming languages, their environment and system software interfaces - Native COBOL Syntax for XML Support
- ISO/IEC TR 24717:2009 Information technology - Programming languages, their environments and system software interfaces - Collection classes for programming language COBOL
- ISO/IEC TR 24718:2005 Information technology - Programming languages - Guide for the use of the Ada Ravenscar Profile in high integrity systems
- ISO/IEC TR 24720:2008 Information technology - Automatic identification and data capture techniques - Guidelines for direct part marking (DPM)
- ISO/IEC TR 24722:2015 Information technology – Biometrics – Multimodal and other multibiometric fusion
- ISO/IEC 24723:2010 Information technology - Automatic identification and data capture techniques - GS1 Composite bar code symbology specification
- ISO/IEC 24724:2011 Information technology - Automatic identification and data capture techniques - GS1 DataBar bar code symbology specification
- ISO/IEC 24727 Identification cards – Integrated circuit card programming interfaces
- ISO/IEC 24728:2006 Information technology - Automatic identification and data capture techniques - MicroPDF417 bar code symbology specification
- ISO/IEC TR 24729 Information technology - Radio frequency identification for item management - Implementation guidelines
  - ISO/IEC TR 24729-1:2008 Part 1: RFID-enabled labels and packaging supporting ISO/IEC 18000-6C
  - ISO/IEC TR 24729-2:2008 Part 2: Recycling and RFID tags
  - ISO/IEC TR 24729-3:2009 Part 3: Implementation and operation of UHF RFID Interrogator systems in logistics applications
  - ISO/IEC TR 24729-4:2009 Part 4: Tag data security
- ISO/IEC 24730 Information technology - Real-time locating systems (RTLS)
  - ISO/IEC 24730-1:2014 Part 1: Application programming interface (API)
  - ISO/IEC 24730-2:2012 Part 2: Direct Sequence Spread Spectrum (DSSS) 2,4 GHz air interface protocol
  - ISO/IEC 24730-5:2010 Part 5: Chirp spread spectrum (CSS) at 2,4 GHz air interface
  - ISO/IEC 24730-21:2012 Part 21: Direct Sequence Spread Spectrum (DSSS) 2,4 GHz air interface protocol: Transmitters operating with a single spread code and employing a DBPSK data encoding and BPSK spreading scheme
  - ISO/IEC 24730-22:2012 Part 22: Direct Sequence Spread Spectrum (DSSS) 2,4 GHz air interface protocol: Transmitters operating with multiple spread codes and employing a QPSK data encoding and Walsh offset QPSK (WOQPSK) spreading scheme
  - ISO/IEC 24730-61:2013 Part 61: Low rate pulse repetition frequency Ultra Wide Band (UWB) air interface
  - ISO/IEC 24730-62:2013 Part 62: High rate pulse repetition frequency Ultra Wide Band (UWB) air interface
- ISO/IEC TR 24731 Information technology - Programming languages, their environments and system software interfaces - Extensions to the C library
  - ISO/IEC TR 24731-1:2007 Part 1: Bounds-checking interfaces
  - ISO/IEC TR 24731-2:2010 Part 2: Dynamic Allocation Functions
- ISO/IEC TR 24732:2009 Information technology - Programming languages, their environments and system software interfaces - Extension for the programming language C to support decimal floating-point arithmetic
- ISO/IEC TR 24733:2011 Information technology - Programming languages, their environments and system software interfaces - Extensions for the programming language C++ to support decimal floating-point arithmetic
- ISO/IEC 24738:2006 Information technology – Icon symbols and functions for multimedia link attributes
- ISO/IEC 24739 Information technology - AT Attachment with Packet Interface - 7
  - ISO/IEC 24739-1:2009 Part 1: Register Delivered Command Set, Logical Register Set (ATA/ATAPI-7 V1)
  - ISO/IEC 24739-2:2009 Part 2: Parallel transport protocols and physical interconnect (ATA/ATAPI-7)
  - ISO/IEC 24739-3:2010 Part 3: Serial transport protocols and physical interconnect (ATA/ATAPI-7 V3)
- ISO/IEC 24740:2008 Information technology - Responsive Link (RL)
- ISO/IEC TR 24741:2007 Information technology – Biometrics tutorial
- ISO/IEC 24744:2014 Software Engineering – Metamodel for Development Methodologies
- ISO/IEC 24745:2011 Information technology - Security techniques - Biometric information protection
- ISO/IEC TR 24746:2005 Information technology - Generic cabling for customer premises - Mid-span DTE power insertion
- ISO/IEC 24747:2009 Information technology - Programming languages, their environments and system software interfaces - Extensions to the C Library to support mathematical special functions
- ISO/IEC 24748 Systems and software engineering - Life cycle management
  - ISO/IEC/IEEE 24748-1:2018 Part 1: Guidelines for life cycle management
  - ISO/IEC/IEEE 24748-2:2018 Part 2: Guidelines for the application of ISO/IEC/IEEE 15288 (System life cycle processes)
  - ISO/IEC TR 24748-3:2011 Part 3: Guide to the application of ISO/IEC 12207 (Software life cycle processes)
  - ISO/IEC/IEEE 24748-4:2016 Part 4: Systems engineering planning
  - ISO/IEC/IEEE 24748-5:2017 Part 5: Software development planning
  - ISO/IEC TS 24748-6:2016 Part 6: System integration engineering
- ISO/IEC TR 24750:2007 Information technology - Assessment and mitigation of installed balanced cabling channels in order to support of 10GBASE-T
- ISO/IEC 24751 Information technology - Individualized adaptability and accessibility in e-learning, education and training
  - ISO/IEC 24751-1:2008 Part 1: Framework and reference model
  - ISO/IEC 24751-2:2008 Part 2: "Access for all" personal needs and preferences for digital delivery
  - ISO/IEC 24751-3:2008 Part 3: "Access for all" digital resource description
- ISO/IEC 24752 Information technology – User interfaces – Universal remote console
- ISO/IEC 24753:2011 Information technology - Radio frequency identification (RFID) for item management - Application protocol: encoding and processing rules for sensors and batteries
- ISO/IEC 24754 Information technology - Document description and processing languages - Minimum requirements for specifying document rendering systems
  - ISO/IEC 24754-1:2008 Part 1: Feature specifications for document rendering systems
  - ISO/IEC TR 24754-2:2011 Part 2: Formatting specifications for document rendering systems
- ISO/IEC 24755:2007 Information technology - Screen icons and symbols for personal mobile communication devices
- ISO/IEC 24756:2009 Information technology - Framework for specifying a common access profile (CAP) of needs and capabilities of users, systems, and their environments
- ISO/IEC 24757:2008 Information technology - Keyboard interaction model - Machine-readable keyboard description
- ISO/IEC 24759:2017 Information technology - Security techniques - Test requirements for cryptographic modules
- ISO/IEC 24760 Information technology - Security techniques - A framework for identity management
  - ISO/IEC 24760-1:2011 Part 1: Terminology and concepts
  - ISO/IEC 24760-2:2015 Part 2: Reference architecture and requirements
  - ISO/IEC 24760-3:2016 Part 3: Practice
- ISO/IEC 24761:2009 Information technology - Security techniques - Authentication context for biometrics
- ISO/IEC 24762:2008 Information technology – Security techniques – Guidelines for information and communications technology disaster recovery services
- ISO/IEC TR 24763:2011 Information technology - Learning, education and training - Conceptual Reference Model for Competency Information and Related Objects
- ISO/IEC 24764:2010 Information technology - Generic cabling systems for data centres
- ISO/IEC/IEEE 24765:2017 Systems and software engineering - Vocabulary
- ISO/IEC TR 24766:2009 Information technology - Systems and software engineering - Guide for requirements engineering tool capabilities
- ISO/IEC 24767 Information technology - Home network security
  - ISO/IEC 24767-1:2008 Part 1: Security requirements
  - ISO/IEC 24767-2:2009 Part 2: Internal security services: Secure Communication Protocol for Middleware (SCPM)
- ISO/IEC 24769 Information technology - Real-time locating systems (RTLS) device conformance test methods
  - ISO/IEC 24769-2:2013 Part 2: Test methods for air interface communication at 2,4 GHz
  - ISO/IEC 24769-5:2012 Part 5: Test methods for chirp spread spectrum (CSS) at 2,4 GHz air interface
  - ISO/IEC 24769-61:2015 Part 61: Low rate pulse repetition frequency Ultra Wide Band (UWB) air interface
  - ISO/IEC 24769-62:2015 Part 62: High rate pulse repetition frequency Ultra Wide Band (UWB) air interface
- ISO/IEC 24770:2012 Information technology - Real-time locating system (RTLS) device performance test methods - Test methods for air interface communication at 2,4 GHz
  - ISO/IEC 24770-61:2015 Part 61: Low rate pulse repetition frequency Ultra Wide Band (UWB) air interface
  - ISO/IEC 24770-62:2015 Part 62: High rate pulse repetition frequency Ultra Wide Band (UWB) air interface
- ISO/IEC 24771:2014 Information technology – Telecommunications and information exchange between systems – MAC/PHY standard for ad hoc wireless network to support QoS in an industrial work environment
- ISO/IEC TR 24772 Programming languages — Guidance to avoiding vulnerabilities in programming languages
  - ISO/IEC TR 24772-1:2019 Part 1: Language-independent guidance
  - ISO/IEC TR 24772-2:2020 Part 2: Ada
  - ISO/IEC TR 24772-3:2020 Part 3: C
- ISO/IEC 24773:2008 Software engineering - Certification of software engineering professionals - Comparison framework
- ISO/IEC TR 24774:2010 Systems and software engineering - Life cycle management - Guidelines for process description
- ISO/IEC 24775 Information technology - Storage management
  - ISO/IEC 24775-1:2014 Part 1: Overview
  - ISO/IEC 24775-2:2014 Part 2: Common Architecture
  - ISO/IEC 24775-3:2014 Part 3: Common Profiles
  - ISO/IEC 24775-4:2014 Part 4: Block Devices
  - ISO/IEC 24775-5:2014 Part 5: File systems
  - ISO/IEC 24775-6:2014 Part 6: Fabric
  - ISO/IEC 24775-7:2014 Part 7: Host Elements
  - ISO/IEC 24775-8:2014 Part 8: Media Libraries
- ISO/IEC 24778:2008 Information technology - Automatic identification and data capture techniques - Aztec Code bar code symbology specification
- ISO/IEC 24779 Information technology - Cross-jurisdictional and societal aspects of implementation of biometric technologies - Pictograms, icons and symbols for use with biometric systems
  - ISO/IEC 24779-1:2016 Part 1: General principles
  - ISO/IEC 24779-4:2017 Part 4: Fingerprint applications
  - ISO/IEC 24779-9:2015 Part 9: Vascular applications
- ISO/IEC TR 24785:2009 Information technology – Taxonomy of cultural and linguistic adaptability user requirements
- ISO/IEC 24786:2009 Information technology – User interfaces – Accessible user interface for accessibility settings
- ISO/IEC 24787:2010 Information technology – Identification cards – On-card biometric comparison
- ISO/IEC 24789 Identification cards – Card service life
  - ISO/IEC 24789-1:2012 Part 1: Application profiles and requirements
  - ISO/IEC 24789-2:2011 Part 2: Methods of evaluation
- ISO/IEC 24791 Information technology - Radio frequency identification (RFID) for item management - Software system infrastructure
  - ISO/IEC 24791-1:2010 Part 1: Architecture
  - ISO/IEC 24791-2:2011 Part 2: Data management
  - ISO/IEC 24791-3:2014 Part 3: Device management
  - ISO/IEC 24791-5:2012 Part 5: Device interface
- ISO/IEC 24792:2010 Information technology – Telecommunications and information exchange between systems – Multicast Session Management Protocol (MSMP)
- ISO/IEC 24793 Information technology – Mobile multicast communications
  - ISO/IEC 24793-1:2010 Framework
  - ISO/IEC 24793-2:2010 Protocol over native IP multicast networks
- ISO/IEC 24800 Information technology - JPSearch
  - ISO/IEC TR 24800-1:2012 Part 1: System framework and components
  - ISO/IEC 24800-2:2011 Part 2: Registration, identification and management of schema and ontology
  - ISO/IEC 24800-3:2010 Part 3: Query format
  - ISO/IEC 24800-4:2010 Part 4: File format for metadata embedded in image data (JPEG and JPEG 2000)
  - ISO/IEC 24800-5:2011 Part 5: Data interchange format between image repositories
  - ISO/IEC 24800-6:2012 Part 6: Reference software
- ISO 24801 Recreational diving services – Requirements for the training of recreational scuba divers
  - ISO 24801-1:2014 Part 1: Level 1 – Supervised diver
  - ISO 24801-2:2014 Part 2: Level 2 – Autonomous diver
  - ISO 24801-3:2014 Part 3: Level 3 – Dive leader
- ISO 24802 Recreational diving services – Requirements for the training of scuba instructors
  - ISO 24802-1:2014 Part 1: Level 1
  - ISO 24802-2:2014 Part 2: Level 2
- ISO 24803:2017 Recreational diving services – Requirements for recreational diving providers
- ISO/IEC 24824 Information technology – Generic applications of ASN.1
  - ISO/IEC 24824-1:2007 Fast infoset
  - ISO/IEC 24824-2:2006 Fast Web Services
  - ISO/IEC 24824-3:2008 Fast infoset security
- ISO/TR 24971:2013 Medical devices – Guidance on the application of ISO 14971
- ISO 24978:2009 Intelligent transport systems – ITS Safety and emergency messages using any available wireless media – Data registry procedures

== ISO 25000 – ISO 25999 ==
- ISO/IEC 25000:2014 Systems and software engineering - Systems and software Quality Requirements and Evaluation (SQuaRE) - Guide to SQuaRE
- ISO/IEC 25001:2014 Systems and software engineering - Systems and software Quality Requirements and Evaluation (SQuaRE) - Planning and management
- ISO/IEC 25002:development Systems and software engineering - Systems and software Quality Requirements and Evaluation (SQuaRE) - Quality models overview and usage
- ISO/IEC 25010:2011 Systems and software engineering - Systems and software Quality Requirements and Evaluation (SQuaRE) - System and software quality models
- ISO/IEC TS 25011:2017 Information technology - Systems and software quality requirements and evaluation (SQuaRE) - Service quality models
- ISO/IEC 25012:2008 Software engineering - Software product Quality Requirements and Evaluation (SQuaRE) - Data quality model
- ISO/IEC 25020:2007 Software engineering - Software product Quality Requirements and Evaluation (SQuaRE) - Measurement reference model and guide
- ISO/IEC 25021:2012 Systems and software engineering - Systems and software Quality Requirements and Evaluation (SQuaRE) - Quality measure elements
- ISO/IEC 25022:2016 Systems and software engineering - Systems and software quality requirements and evaluation (SQuaRE) - Measurement of quality in use
- ISO/IEC 25023:2016 Systems and software engineering - Systems and software Quality Requirements and Evaluation (SQuaRE) - Measurement of system and software product quality
- ISO/IEC 25024:2015 Systems and software engineering - Systems and software Quality Requirements and Evaluation (SQuaRE) - Measurement of data quality
- ISO/IEC 25030:2007 Software engineering - Software product Quality Requirements and Evaluation (SQuaRE) - Quality requirements
- ISO/IEC 25040:2011 Systems and software engineering - Systems and software Quality Requirements and Evaluation (SQuaRE) - Evaluation process
- ISO/IEC 25041:2012 Systems and software engineering - Systems and software Quality Requirements and Evaluation (SQuaRE) - Evaluation guide for developers, acquirers and independent evaluators
- ISO/IEC 25045:2010 Systems and software engineering - Systems and software Quality Requirements and Evaluation (SQuaRE) - Evaluation module for recoverability
- ISO/IEC 25051:2014 Software engineering - Systems and software Quality Requirements and Evaluation (SQuaRE) - Requirements for quality of Ready to Use Software Product (RUSP) and instructions for testing
- ISO/IEC TR 25060:2010 Systems and software engineering - Systems and software product Quality Requirements and Evaluation (SQuaRE) - Common Industry Format (CIF) for usability: General framework for usability-related information
- ISO/IEC 25062:2006 Software engineering - Software product Quality Requirements and Evaluation (SQuaRE) - Common Industry Format (CIF) for usability test reports
- ISO/IEC 25063:2014 Systems and software engineering - Systems and software product Quality Requirements and Evaluation (SQuaRE) - Common Industry Format (CIF) for usability: Context of use description
- ISO/IEC 25064:2013 Systems and software engineering - Software product Quality Requirements and Evaluation (SQuaRE) - Common Industry Format (CIF) for usability: User needs report
- ISO/IEC 25066:2016 Systems and software engineering - Systems and software Quality Requirements and Evaluation (SQuaRE) - Common Industry Format (CIF) for Usability—Evaluation Report
- ISO/TR 25100:2012 Intelligent transport systems – Systems architecture – Harmonization of ITS data concepts
- ISO/TR 25102:2008 Intelligent transport systems – System architecture – 'Use Case' pro-forma template
- ISO/TR 25104:2008 Intelligent transport systems – System architecture, taxonomy, terminology and data modelling – Training requirements for ITS architecture
- ISO/TS 25110:2017 Electronic fee collection – Interface definition for on-board account using integrated circuit card (ICC)
- ISO 25111:2009 Intelligent transport systems – Communications access for land mobiles (CALM) – General requirements for using public networks
- ISO 25112:2010 Intelligent transport systems – Communications access for land mobiles (CALM) – Mobile wireless broadband using IEEE 802.16
- ISO 25113:2010 Intelligent transport systems – Communications access for land mobiles (CALM) – Mobile wireless broadband using HC-SDMA
- ISO/TS 25114:2010 Intelligent transport systems – Probe data reporting management (PDRM)
- ISO 25119 Tractors and machinery for agriculture and forestry – Safety-related parts of control systems
  - ISO 25119-1:2018 Part 1: General principles for design and development
  - ISO 25119-2:2018 Part 2: Concept phase
  - ISO 25119-3:2018 Part 3: Series development, hardware and software
  - ISO 25119-4:2018 Part 4: Production, operation, modification and supporting processes
- ISO 25178 Geometrical product specifications (GPS) – Surface texture: Areal
- ISO/IEC 25185 Identification cards – Integrated circuit card authentication protocols
  - ISO/IEC 25185-1:2016 Part 1: Protocol for Lightweight
- ISO 25237:2017 Health informatics – Pseudonymization
- ISO/TS 25237:2008 Health informatics – Pseudonymization
- ISO 25239 Friction stir welding - Aluminium
  - ISO 25239-1:2011 Part 1: Vocabulary
- ISO/TR 25257:2009 Health informatics – Business requirements for an international coding system for medicinal products
- ISO/TS 25377:2007 Hydrometric uncertainty guidance (HUG)
- ISO 25378:2011 Geometrical product specifications (GPS) - Characteristics and conditions - Definitions
- ISO/TR 25417:2007 Acoustics – Definitions of basic quantities and terms
- ISO/IEC 25422:2025 Information technology — 3D Manufacturing Format (3MF) specification suite
- ISO/IEC 25434:2008 Information technology - Data interchange on 120 mm and 80 mm optical disk using +R DL format - Capacity: 8,55 Gbytes and 2,66 Gbytes per side (recording speed up to 16X)
- ISO/IEC 25435:2006 Data Interchange on 60 mm Read-Only ODC - Capacity: 1,8 Gbytes (UMDTM)
- ISO/IEC 25436:2006 Information technology - Eiffel: Analysis, Design and Programming Language
- ISO/IEC 25437:2012 Information technology – Telecommunications and information exchange between systems – WS-Session – Web services for application session services
- ISO/IEC TR 25438:2006 Information technology - Common Language Infrastructure (CLI) - Technical Report: Common Generics
- ISO 25539 Cardiovascular implants - Endovascular devices
  - ISO 25539-1:2017 Part 1: Endovascular prostheses
  - ISO 25539-2:2012 Part 2: Vascular stents
  - ISO 25539-3:2011 Part 3: Vena cava filters
- ISO 25577:2013 Information and documentation - MarcXchange
- ISO 25639 Exhibitions, shows, fairs and conventions
  - ISO 25639-1:2008 Part 1: Vocabulary
  - ISO 25639-2:2008 Part 2: Measurement procedures for statistical purposes
- ISO/TR 25679:2005 Mechanical testing of metals – Symbols and definitions in published standards
- ISO 25720:2009 Health informatics – Genomic Sequence Variation Markup Language (GSVML)
- ISO/TR 25901 Welding and allied processes - Vocabulary
  - ISO/TR 25901-1:2016 Part 1: General terms
  - ISO/TR 25901-3:2016 Part 3: Welding processes
  - ISO/TR 25901-4:2016 Part 4: Arc welding
- ISO 25947 Fireworks – Categories 1, 2 and 3
  - ISO 25947-1:2017 Part 1: Terminology
- ISO 25964 Information and documentation - Thesauri and interoperability with other vocabularies
