= Cedex =

Cedex or CEDEX may refer to:

- Centro de Estudios y Experimentación de Obras Públicas, a civil engineering research agency in Spain
- Courrier d'Entreprise à Distribution EXceptionnelle, a system designed for recipients of large volumes of mail in France
- Container Equipment Data Exchange, also known as ISO 9897
- The Centre for Decision Research and Experimental Economics at the University of Nottingham
