= VDX (library software) =

Software for interlibrary loan

VDX (standing for Virtual Document eXchange) is a software product for interlibrary loan (ILL) and document request management. VDX was developed by UK company Fretwell-Downing Informatics, a company which in 2005 was taken over by OCLC PICA, itself wholly acquired by OCLC Online Computer Library Center in 2007.

VDX allows library staff to create and manage document borrowing and lending requests between participating libraries. VDX manages all the stages of the ILL process. It is also an efficient way to collect copyright fees for copyright holders such as authors and publishers.

== Description ==
ILL requests are sent to VDX through a process called automediation. VDX validates the request for the necessary information — author, title, date of publication — and searches for the item. It then creates a routing list (or "rota") of libraries that own the item. The request is sent to the first library on the rota, which indicates whether it can supply the item. If the library cannot lend or process the request, it will be automatically directed to the next library on the routing list, and so on, until a library is found that can supply the document. The document is then sent to the requesting library. Throughout the document exchange process, the requesting library can check the status of the request at any time.

VDX is based on ISO 10161, which is the international standard for ILL. ISO 10161 defines communication protocols and guarantees that ILL information can be communicated between different ILL programs (such as VDX and similar products). Another standard, ISO 10160, determines the terminology that is used for ILL transactions across various document exchange systems.

Development of VDX ceased years ago (as of 2018), and it will not incorporate the new ISO 18626 standard.
