= Van der Meer formula =

Formula to calculate the stability of armourstone under wave action

The Van der Meer formula is a formula for calculating the required stone weight for armourstone under the influence of (wind) waves. This is necessary for the design of breakwaters and shoreline protection. Around 1985 it was found that the Hudson formula in use at that time had considerable limitations (only valid for permeable breakwaters and steep (storm) waves). That is why the Dutch government agency Rijkswaterstaat commissioned Deltares to start research for a more complete formula. This research, conducted by Jentsje van der Meer, resulted in the Van der Meer formula in 1988, as described in his dissertation. This formula reads

$$\frac{H_s}{\Delta \cdot d_{n50}}=
\begin{cases} c_{p} P^{0.18}  \left (\frac{S}{\sqrt{N}} \right)^{0.2} \xi_m^{-0.5}                  & \mbox{when } \xi_m < \xi{cr}   \quad [\mathrm{plunging}]
\\            c_{s} P^{-0.13} \left (\frac{S}{\sqrt{N}} \right)^{0.2} \xi_m^{P}   \sqrt{\cot \alpha} & \mbox{when } \xi_m \ge \xi{cr} \quad [\mathrm{surging}]
\end{cases}$$

and

$$\xi_{cr} = \left[ \frac{c_p}{c_s}P^{0.31} \sqrt{\tan \alpha} \right]^{\frac{1}{P+0.5}}$$

In this formula:

H_{s} = Significant wave height at the toe of the construction
Δ = relative density of the stone (= (ρ_{s} -ρ_{w})/ρ_{w}) where ρ_{s} is the density of the stone and ρ_{w} is the density of the water
d_{n50} = nominal stone diameter
α = breakwater slope
P = notional permeability
S = Damage number
N = number of waves in the storm
ξ_{m} = the Iribarren number calculated with the Tm

This formula yields that the damage S is proportionnal to H_{s}^{5}.

For design purposes, for the coefficient c_{p} the value of 5,2 and for c_{s} the value 0,87 is recommended.

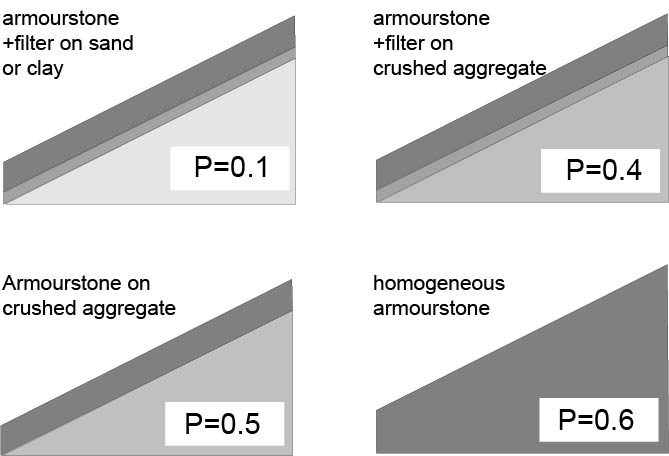
Notional permeability according to Van der Meer (1988)

The value of P can be read from attached graph. Until now, there is no good method for determining P different than with accompanying pictures. Research is under way to try to determine the value of P using calculation models that can simulate the water movement in the breakwater (OpenFOAM models).

The value of the damage number S is defined as

$S=\frac{A}{d_{n50}^2}$

where A is the area of the erosion area. Permissible values for S are:

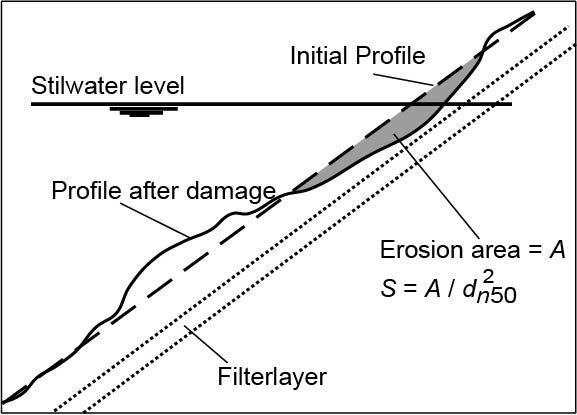
Definition of the damage area in the Van der Meer formula

Slope	Start of damage	Average damage, repair needed	Failure (core is exposed)
1:1.5	2	3-5	8
1:2	2	4-6	8
1:3	2	6-9	12
1:4	3	8-12	17
1:6	3	8-12	17

== Further developments ==
After its publication the VdM formula was re-assessed by several researchers. E.g., Vidal (2006) suggested to replace H_{s} by H_{50} defined as the average wave height of the 50 highest waves reaching a rubble-mound breakwater in its useful life. His formulation can therefore predict the observed damage independently of the sea state wave height distribution or the succession of sea states, i.e., the number of waves N can be deleted from the formula. However, the calculus of H_{50} requires detailed information of the incident wave statistics at the structure's toe, both for short term (sea states) and long term (wave regimes).

In 2021, recognising that the spectral wave period had largely replaced the use of mean or peak periods for wave overtopping calculations in the period since the formula first appeared, van der Meer published a paper in which the formula was rewritten to include this spectral wave period, based on original data.
