= Kate Edith Pierce =

British librarian (1873–1966)

- Born: 30 November 1873; Kettering, England
- Died: 27 March 1966 (aged 92); Royal Tunbridge Wells, England
- Education: private
- Occupation: librarian

Kate Edith Pierce (30 November 1873 – 27 March 1966) was a British librarian based in Kettering. She was appointed chief librarian and introduced an early open-shelf library. Aided by Carnegie funding she opened one of the first purpose-built open shelf libraries and introduced Inter-Library Lending in the 1930s.

== Life ==
Pierce was the first of two girls born to Emma Norah (born Mawby) and Edward Pierce in Kettering. Her father was an attorney's clerk. She rose to be a pupil-teacher at the private school she attended before deciding to be a librarian. There were no courses in librarianship, so she had on the job training at Clerkenwell public library. She was inspired by James Duff Brown who had designed the "first ever open shelf library system launched in May, 1893".

In 1896 there were about 240 public libraries in England, only 16 of them were led by a woman. Pierce became the 17th when she was appointed to be the chief librarian in Kettering. Her new library was in the Corn Market Hall and it was, like Clerkenwell, open-access. It was one of the first four in the country. Because visitors were allowed to find their own books, subject classification became more important. Pierce used the Quinn-Brown approach (and she was still using it in 1937).

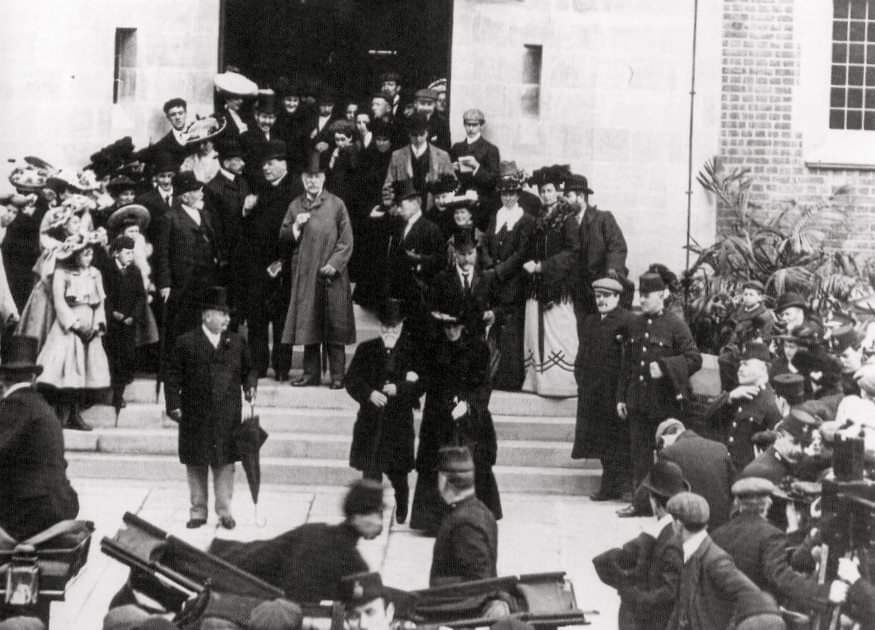
Andrew Carnegie opening Kettering's new library (foreground with woman)

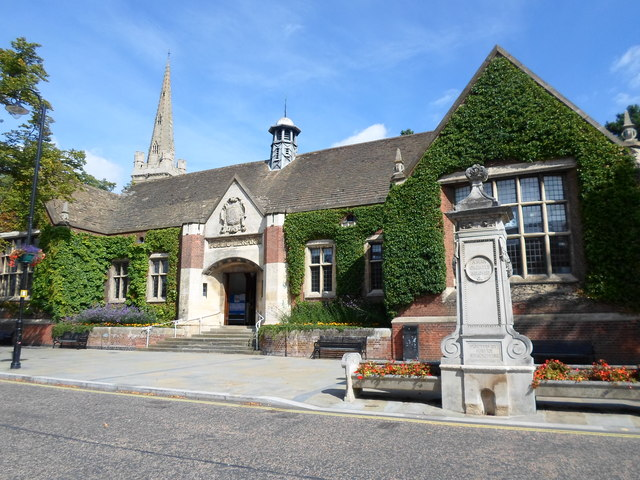
Kettering's purpose-built Carnegie Public Library

The library moved in 1901 and again in 1904 to one of the first purpose-built open access libraries following £8,000 from Andrew Carnegie. Carnegie had funded hundreds of libraries but he attended this one in person. He used a silver key to open the library and Pierce let him borrow the first book. Pierce defended the right of women to become librarians, joining debates in the pages of the Library World journal.

In 1913 she also took on the honorary curatorship of the Alfred East Art Gallery. Her open access library was admired as others introduced similar systems. She became a Fellow of the Library Association. When the Central Bureau for the Employment of Women wrote A Guide to the Professions and Occupations of Educated Women and Girls in 1919 she wrote the section on librarianship. In 1914 she was the President of the North Midlands Library Association for the first time when women librarians began to be the majority. She served for the last time as president in 1932–34 when the NMLA merged with the Library Association. After this she became the chair of the newly formed East Midlands Regional Library Bureau. This had been enabled by Carnegie Trust funding and it enabled "Inter-Library Lending".

== Death and legacy ==
Pierce retired and died in Royal Tunbridge Wells in 1966. She left £2200 to the Library Association and this funds the Kate Pierce international award to enable international study.
