= Armourstone =

Broken stone (very course aggregate) used in hydraulic engineering

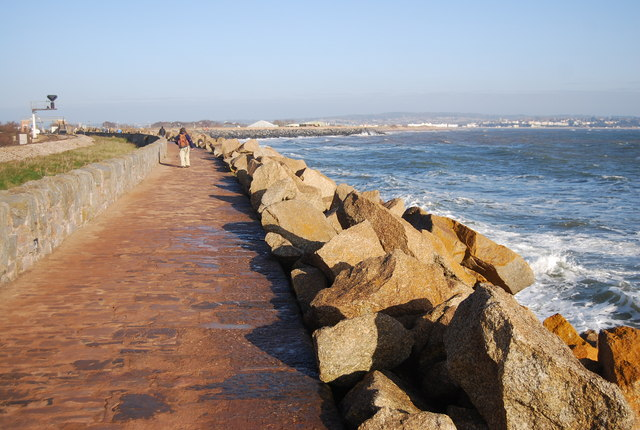
Granite armourstone along the sea wall south of Dawlish Warren (UK)

Armourstone is a generic term for broken stone with stone masses between 100 and 10,000 kilograms (220 and 22,050 lb) (very coarse aggregate) that is suitable for use in hydraulic engineering. Dimensions and characteristics for armourstone are laid down in European Standard EN13383. In the United States, there are a number of different standards and publications setting out different methodologies for classifying armourstone, ranging from weight-based classifications to gradation curves and size-based classifications.

== Stone Classes ==
=== European Practice to EN13383 ===
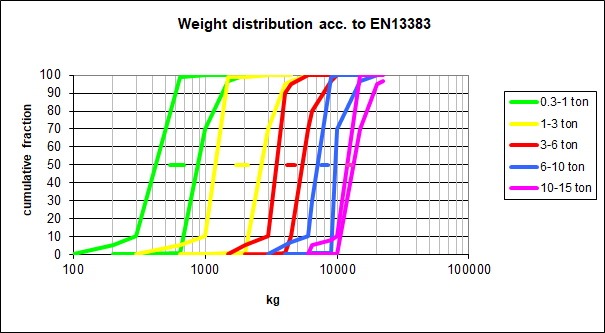
Distribution HMA and HMB

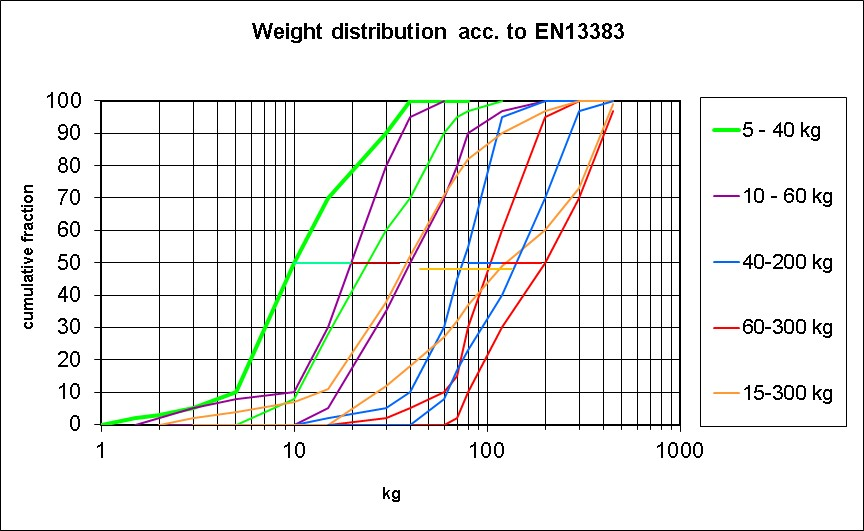
Distribution LMA and LMB

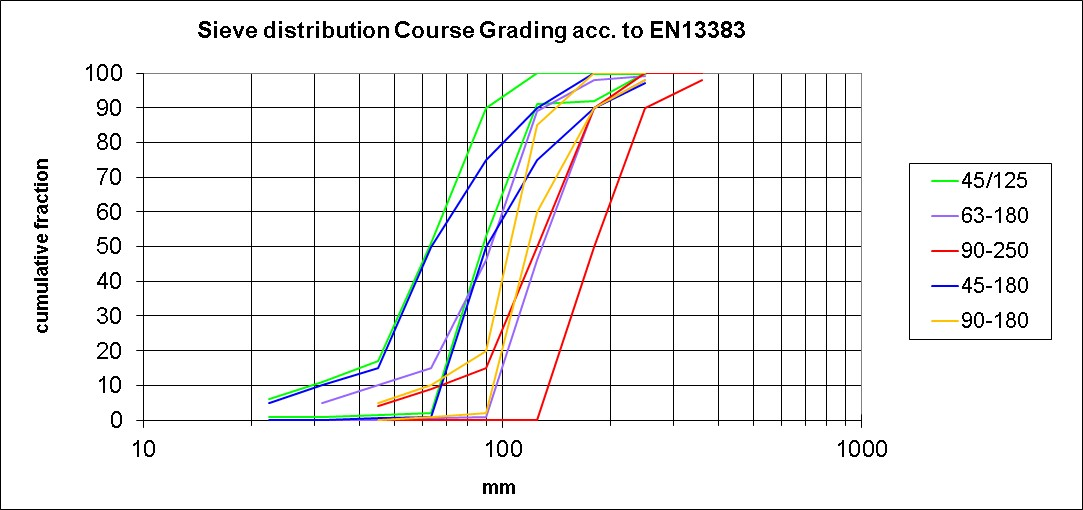
Distribution CP

Armourstone is available in standardised stone classes, defined by both a lower and upper value of the stone mass within these classes. For instance, Class 60-300 signifies that up to 10% of the stones weigh less than 60 kg (130 lb) and up to 30% weigh more than 300 kg (660 lb). The standard also mentions values which shouldn't be exceeded by 5% or 3%.

For particular applications like a top layer for a breakwater or bank protection, the median stone mass size, known as M_{50}, is frequently required. This pertains to a category A stone. It doesn't relate to category B stone. There are two main groups: HM and LM, standing for Heavy and Light respectively. A stone class might be defined according to EN 13383 as, for instance, HM_{A}300-1000.

The accompanying graphs offer an overview of all stone classes. A distribution between the two curves in the graph fulfils the criteria for category B. Furthermore, for category A compliance, the M_{EM} should intersect the short horizontal line. M_{EM} represents the average stone mass, meaning the total sample mass divided by the count of stones in that sample. It's worth noting that in wider ranges, notably 15-300 and 40-400, there's a considerable difference; for the 15-300 class, M_{50} is 1.57 times the M_{EM}.

Additionally, there's a defined stone class called CP (Coarse). Despite its name suggesting otherwise, the class CP is smaller than LM. This naming convention exists because this class corresponds to the coarse category in the standard for fractional stone used as supplemental material (aggregate). For the CP stone class, size isn't denoted in kg, but in mm. Based on the primary data from standard EN13383, the following table is presented:

Class name	range for M_{EM} (kg)	range for d_{50} (cm)	ratio d_{85}/d_{16}	calculation value for d_{n50} (cm)	layer thickness (2 d_{n50}) (cm)	min. dumping quantity with layer thickness 2*d_{n}_{50} (kg/m^{2})
CP45/125	0.4 - 1.2	6.3 - 9.0	2.8	6.4	20	300
CP63/180	1.2 - 3.8	9.0 - 12.5	2.8	9.0	20	300
CP90/250	3.1 - 9.3	12.5 - 18	2.8	12.8	20	300
CP45/180	0.4 - 1.2	6.3 - 9.0	4.0	6.4	20	300
CP90/180	2.1 - 2.8	11 - 12	2.0	9.7	20	300
LM_{A}5-40	10 - 20	15 - 20	1.7	17	35	525
LM_{A}10-60	20 - 35	20 - 24	1.5	21	42	630
LM_{A}40-200	80 -120	31 - 36	1.5	34	68	1020
LM_{A}60-300	120 - 190	36 - 41	1.5	38	76	1140
LM_{A}15-300	45 - 135	26 - 37	2.7	31	62	930
HM_{A}300-1000	540 - 690	55 - 64	1.4	59	118	1770
HM_{A}1000-3000	1700 -2100	86 - 92	1.4	90	180	2700
HM_{A}3000-6000	4200 - 4800	117 - 122	1.2	118	236	3540
HM_{A}6000-10000	7500 - 8500	141 - 147	1.2	144	288	4320
HM_{A}10000-15000	12000 - 13000	165 - 170	1.2	168	336	5040

=== Practice in the United States ===
Several standards and guidelines are identified for classifying armourstone used in coastal and river engineering in the United States, some of which are summarised in the following table:

Standard/Publication	Notes
Hydraulic Engineering Circular 11 (HEC-11) (Brown and Clyde, 1989)	Identifies six weight classes based on the minimum allowable d_{50}. Classes range from "facing" (75 lbs) to 2 tonnes.
California Bank and Shore Rock Slope Protection Design, CABS (Racin et al., 2000)	Provides nine weight classes based on the minimum allowable W_{50}. Classes range from "light" (200 lbs), to 8 tonnes. Also provides three classes of "backing" stone, all having a minimum allowable W_{50} less than 75 lbs.
Engineer Manual 1601 (United States Army Corps of Engineers, 1994)	Defines 12 classes using the d_{100} particle size. Classes are identified in 3-inch increments ranging from 12 in to 54 in. Specifies the minimum and maximum allowable W_{100}, W_{50}, and W_{15} for each class.
Hydraulic Design Series No. 6 (HDS 6) (Richardson et al., 2001)	Establishes an "ideal" gradation curve using the designer's d_{50} size. References to USACE procedures for establishing upper and lower limiting curves are made.
American Society for Testing of Materials Standard Practice D 6092 (ASTM, 2021)	Provides six weight classes based on the minimum allowable W_{50}. Classes range from "R-20" (20 lbs) to "R-1500" (1,500 lbs) - see the table below. The standard also provides conversions to equivalent size using different shapes and considers specific gravities ranging from 2.60 to 2.75. The standard does not cover large armourstone employed for outer harbour structures such as breakwaters and revetments.

These standards provide different methodologies for classifying armourstone, ranging from weight-based classifications to gradation curves and size-based classifications. Guidance for the use of large armourstone is given in various USACE publications including the Coastal Engineering Manual.

US Standard sizes of riprap to ASTM D 6092
Particle Mass		Size Designation (Class)					
Pounds	Kilograms	R-1500	R-700	R-300	R-150	R-60	R-20
3000	1400	100	—	—	—	—	
1500	680	50-100	100	—	—	—	
1000	450	—	—	—	—	—	
700	320	15-50	50-100	100	—	—	
500	230	—	—	—	—	—	
300	140	—	15-50	50-100	100	—	
250	110	0-15	—	—	—	—	
150	68	—	—	15-50	50-100	100	
60	27	—	0-15	—	15-50	50-100	
45	20	—	—	0-15	—	—	100
30	14	—	—	—	—	15-50	
20	9.1	—	—	—	0-15	—	50-100
10	4.5	—	—	—	—	0-15	15-50
2	0.9	—	—	—	—	—	0-15
Note: Values in each cell represent the percentage by weight of stones lighter than the mass specified

== Median Stone Mass M_{50} ==
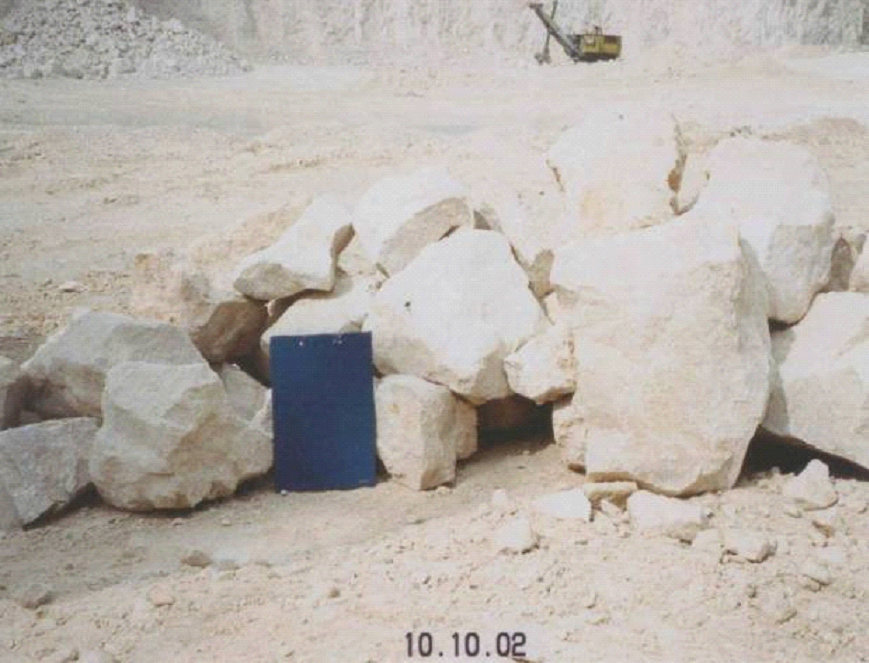
Stone sample comprising 50 stones

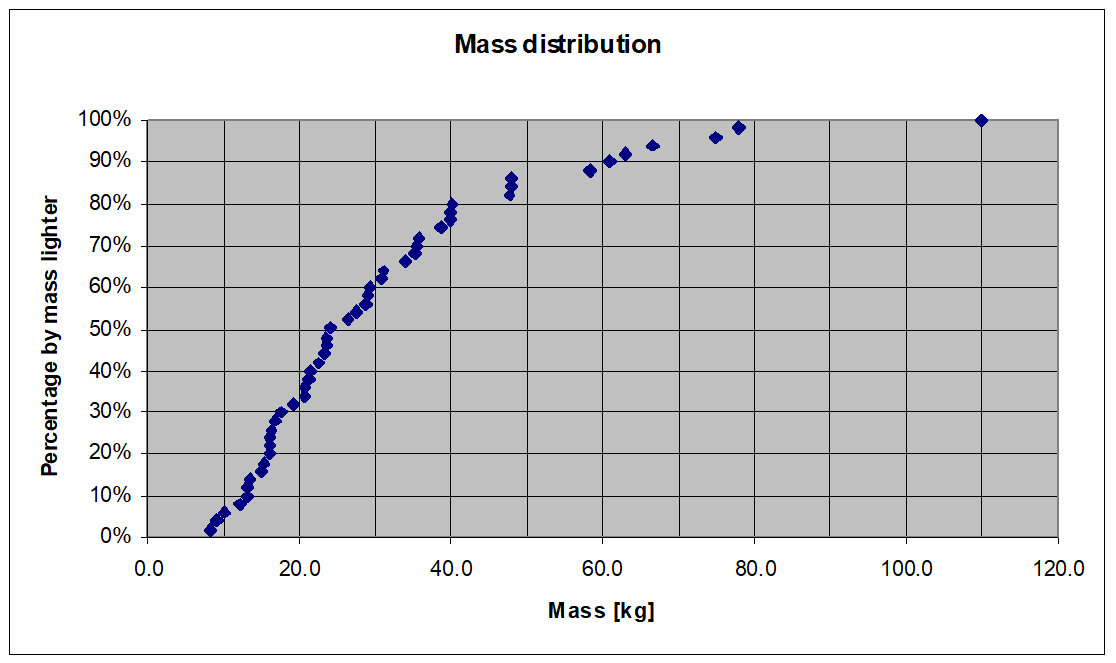
Distribution of the weights of the 50 stones

For fine-grained materials, such as sand, the size is typically represented by the median diameter. This measurement is ascertained by sieving the sand. However, for armourstone, producing a sieve curve isn't feasible because the stones are too large for sieving. Therefore, the M_{50} measurement is employed. It is calculated by obtaining a sample of stones, determining the mass of each stone, arranging these masses by size, and then creating a cumulative mass curve. Within this curve, one can identify the M_{50} value. It's essential to note that the term median stone mass is technically inaccurate, as the stone with mass M_{50} doesn't necessarily represent the median stone in the sample.

To illustrate, consider a sample of 50 stones sourced from a quarry in Bulgaria. The blue rectangle is of A4 size. Every stone's weight is individually recorded, and their masses are illustrated in the attached graph. The horizontal axis represents the individual stone mass, while the vertical axis denotes the cumulative mass as a percentage of the entire sample's mass. At the 50% mark, the M_{50} value is discerned to be 24kg. The true median for this sample is the mean mass of the 25th and 26th stones. In this specific instance, the M_{50} closely matches the median mass, which is 26kg. This sample meets the criteria for LM_{A}5-40. However, it's important to note that the sample size is insufficient. According to EN13383, such a sample should comprise at least 200 stones.

== Nominal Diameter ==
Many design formulas do not account for stone mass but rather for diameter. As a result, a method for conversion is required. This method is identified as the nominal diameter. Essentially, it represents the size of a cube's edge that weighs the same as the stone. The formula for this is:

$d_n = \sqrt[3]{M/\rho}$

Often, the median value is utilised for this purpose, represented as d_{n50}. Typically, the following relationship can be used for conversion:

$d_{n50} = F_s d_{50} = 0.84 d_{50}$

Here, F_{s} represents the shape factor. The shape factor can vary substantially, typically ranging between 0.7 and 0.9.

Referring to the aforementioned example from Bulgaria, the d_{n50} was also determined. Given the local stone's density (which is limestone) stands at 2284 kg/m^{3}, the d_{n50} is calculated to be 22cm. It may be observed that the stones in the sample appear much larger to the eye. This visual misperception can be attributed to a few particularly large stones within the sample, which distort the overall impression.

== Additional Parameters ==
The EN13383 standard elaborates on numerous parameters that define the quality of armourstone. This includes attributes like the shape parameter (measured as Length/Thickness), resistance to fracturing, and the capacity for water absorption. It's pivotal to understand that while the standard delineates how to characterise the quality of armourstone, it doesn't specify the requisite quality for a given application. Such specifics are typically found in design manuals and guidelines, including the Rock Manual.

== Establishing the Necessary Stone Weight ==
When determining the weight of stone required under the influence of waves, one might utilise the (now dated) Hudson Formula or the Van der Meer formula. For computations pertaining to stone weight in flows, the Izbash formula is advisable.
