= Luis Iribarren =

Spanish footballer (1902–1984)

Personal information
- Full name: Luis Iribarren Cavanilles
- Date of birth: 19 February 1902
- Place of birth: Irún, Spain
- Date of death: 4 May 1984 (aged 82)
- Place of death: Madrid, Spain

Senior career*
Years	Team	Apps	(Gls)
- Real Unión
- Real Sociedad Gimnástica Española

Managerial career
- 1953–1954: Spain
- * Club domestic league appearances and goals

Luis Iribarren Cavanilles (19 February 1902 – 4 May 1984) was a Spanish football player and manager who managed the Spain national team in four matches between 1953 and 1954.

Iribarren's first match in charge was a friendly against Sweden, which ended in a 2–2 draw. Iribarren then oversaw Spain's 1954 FIFA World Cup qualification matches against Turkey. Spain won the first leg of the tie 4–1 in Madrid on 6 January 1954, but lost the return match 1–0 in Istanbul on 14 March 1954. As goal difference had not yet been introduced by FIFA, a play-off match was required, which took place at the Stadio Olimpico in Rome on 17 March 1954. The match ended in a 2–2 draw, with Turkey advancing after lots were drawn.

Iribarren was a qualified dentist and the younger brother of the notable civil engineer, Ramón Iribarren.

== Managerial statistics ==
Managerial record
Team	From	To	Record								Ref
Team	From	To	G	W	D	L	GF	GA	GD	Win %	Ref
Spain	1953	1954	4	1	1	2	8	6	+2	25.00	
Total			4	1	1	2	8	6	+2	25.00	
