= ISO 10160 =

ISO standard

ISO 10160 is the ISO standard, first published in 1993, that defines the terminology that is used for interlibrary loan transactions between various document exchange systems such as VDX. It is closely related to ISO 10161, the Interlibrary Loan Application Protocol.
