= Universal Remote Console =

Universal Remote Console (URC) is a standard for defining alternative user interfaces for devices that can be used remotely. In the vocabulary of URC, the remote devices are called "controllers", while the devices they control are called "targets". The controller presents a user interface for the target that can be an alternative in various respects: the user interface language, its ease of use, its accessibility to persons with disabilities, etc. Since user interfaces in different devices or products ("targets") can vary a lot, Universal Remote Console would enable a user to control these products through a single device; this single device would present interfaces that are adapted to the user's needs. The communication between a target and a controller typically uses a wireless protocol; the URC standard does not restrict which protocols can be used. For example, the "Universal Remote Console on HTTP" (URC-HTTP) protocol is a protocol that can be implemented by servers that are compliant with UPnP RemoteUI (CEA-2014).

URC is defined by standard ISO/IEC 24752. This standard builds on earlier work that started in the late 1990s and that was first standardised at the American National Standards Institute (ANSI INCITS 389–2005 to 393–2005). Most parts of the URC standard were updated in 2014, and a new part (web service integration) was added:

- ISO/IEC 24752-1:2014: Information technology—User interfaces—Universal remote console—Part 1: General framework (revision of ISO/IEC 24752-1:2008)
- ISO/IEC 24752-2:2014: Information technology—User interfaces—Universal remote console—Part 2: User interface socket description (revision of ISO/IEC 24752-2:2008)
- ISO/IEC 24752-4:2014: Information technology—User interfaces—Universal remote console—Part 4: Target description (revision of ISO/IEC 24752-4:2008)
- ISO/IEC 24752-5:2014: Information technology—User interfaces—Universal remote console—Part 5: Resource description (revision of ISO/IEC 24752-5:2008)
- ISO/IEC 24752-6:2014: Information technology—User interfaces—Universal remote console—Part 6: Web service integration

== See also ==
- Adaptive user interface
- User interface markup language
