= Hudson's equation =

Equation in coastal engineering

Hudson's equation, also known as Hudson formula, is an equation used by coastal engineers to calculate the minimum size of riprap (armourstone) required to provide satisfactory stability characteristics for rubble structures such as breakwaters under attack from storm wave conditions.

The equation was developed by the United States Army Corps of Engineers, Waterways Experiment Station (WES), following extensive investigations by Hudson (1953, 1959, 1961a, 1961b)

== Initial equation ==
The equation itself is:

$$W =\frac{\gamma_r  H^3}{K_D (S_r-1)^3\cot\theta}$$

where:

- W is the design weight of the riprap armor (Newton)
- $\gamma_r$ is the specific weight of the armor blocks (N/m^{3})
- H is the design wave height at the toe of the structure (m)
- K_{D} is a dimensionless stability coefficient, deduced from laboratory experiments for different kinds of armour blocks and for very small damage (a few blocks removed from the armour layer) (-):

- K_{D} = around 3 for natural quarry rock
- K_{D} = around 10 for artificial interlocking concrete blocks

- S_{r} = (ρ_{r} / ρ_{w} is the relative density of rock, i.e. (ρ_{r} / ρ_{w} - 1) = around 1.58 for granite in sea water
- ρ_{r} and ρ_{w} are the densities of rock and (sea)water (-)
- θ is the angle of revetment with the horizontal

== Updated equation ==
This equation was rewritten as follows in the nineties:

$$\frac{H_s}{\Delta D_{n50}}= \frac{(K_D \cot \theta)^{1/3}}{1.27}$$

where:

- H_{s} is the design significant wave height at the toe of the structure (m)
- Δ is the dimensionless relative buoyant density of rock, i.e. (ρ_{r} / ρ_{w} - 1) = around 1.58 for granite in sea water
- ρ_{r} and ρ_{w} are the densities of rock and (sea)water (kg/m^{3})
- D_{n50} is the nominal median diameter of armor blocks = (W_{50}/ρ_{r})^{1/3} (m)
- K_{D} is a dimensionless stability coefficient, deduced from laboratory experiments for different kinds of armor blocks and for very small damage (a few blocks removed from the armor layer) (-):

- K_{D} = around 3 for natural quarry rock
- K_{D} = around 10 for artificial interlocking concrete blocks

- θ is the angle of revetment with the horizontal

The armourstone may be considered stable if the stability number N_{s} = H_{s} / Δ D_{n50} < 1.5 to 2, with damage rapidly increasing for N_{s} > 3. This formula has been for many years the US standard for the design of rock structures under influence of wave action Obviously, these equations may be used for preliminary design, but scale model testing (2D in wave flume, and 3D in wave basin) is absolutely needed before construction is undertaken.

The drawback of the Hudson formula is that it is only valid for relatively steep waves (so for waves during storms, and less for swell waves). Also it is not valid for breakwaters and shore protections with an impermeable core. It is not possible to estimate the degree of damage on a breakwater during a storm with this formula. Therefore nowadays for armourstone the Van der Meer formula or a variant of it is used. For concrete breakwater elements often a variant of the Hudson formula is used.

== See also ==
- Breakwater (structure)
- Coastal erosion
- Coastal management
