= ISO 10161 =

Interlibrary loan application protocol

ISO 10161 is the ISO standard, first published in 1993, that defines the interlibrary loan (ILL) application protocol for communication between various document exchange systems. It allows ILL systems at different libraries and residing on different hardware platforms and using different software packages such as VDX to communicate with each other to request and receive electronic documents. It is closely related to ISO 10160, the Interlibrary Loan Application Service Definition.
