= Centro de Estudios y Experimentación de Obras Públicas =

Spanish civil engineering research agency

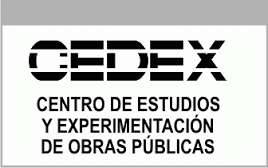
- Website: http://www.cedex.es/CEDEX/lang_castellano/

The Centro de Estudios y Experimentación de Obras Públicas (CEDEX) is a civil engineering research agency in Spain. It was founded in 1957.
