= ISO 9897 =

International standard

ISO 9897 is an ISO international standard for electronic interchange relating to freight containers. It is also known as 'CEDEX' as an acronym of Container Equipment Data Exchange, and "is intended for business entities for use in communications relating to freight container transactions, in particular container Maintenance & Repair estimates and approvals and repair status messages".
