= ISO/IEC 24727 =

International standard for identification smart cards

ISO/IEC 24727 (Identification cards – Integrated circuit card programming interfaces) is the first international standard to address the need for creation of a layered framework to support interoperability of smart cards providing identification, authentication, and (digital) signature services.

The standard is split into six parts:

- ISO/IEC 24727-1:2014 Part 1: Architecture
- ISO/IEC 24727-2:2008 Part 2: Generic card interface
- ISO/IEC 24727-3:2008 Part 3: Application interface
- ISO/IEC 24727-4:2008 Part 4: Application programming interface (API) administration
- ISO/IEC 24727-5:2011 Part 5: Testing procedures
- ISO/IEC 24727-6:2010 Part 6: Registration authority procedures for the authentication protocols for interoperability
