= Stabit =

British wave-dissipating concrete armour unit for breakwaters

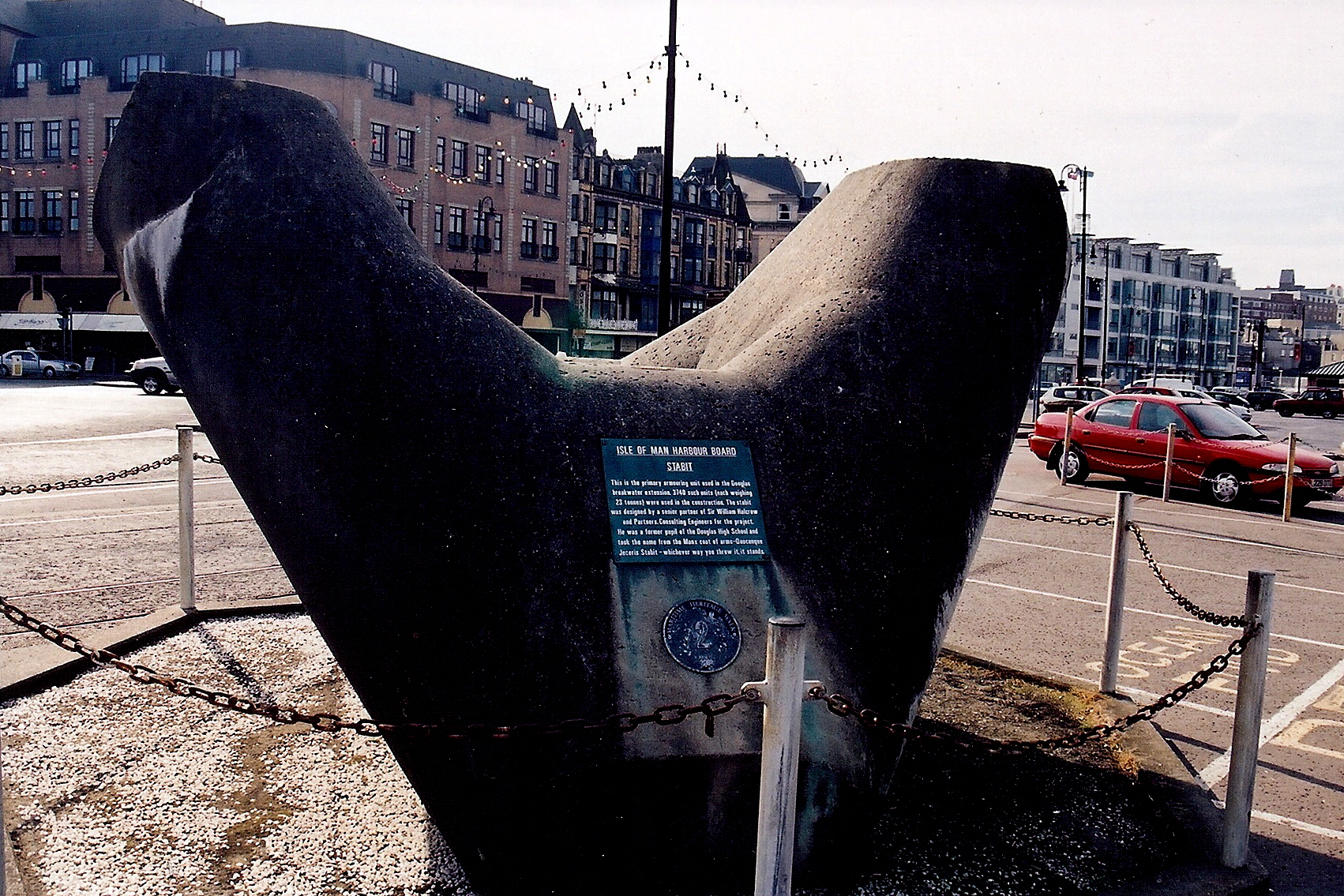
A Stabit displayed as a monument near Loch Promenade, Douglas, Isle of Man

The Stabit is a type of wave-dissipating concrete block (breakwater armour unit) developed in the United Kingdom in 1961 by the consulting engineers Sir William Halcrow & Partners. First used in the reconstruction of the harbour breakwaters at Benghazi, Libya, it was one of the earliest interlocking armour units to follow the French tetrapod of 1950. Stabits have been used on breakwaters and sea defences in Libya, England, the United Arab Emirates and the Isle of Man.

The name is the Latin stabit, "it will stand". According to the Isle of Man Harbour Board, the unit's designer, a former pupil of Douglas High School, took the name from the motto on the coat of arms of the Isle of Man, Quocunque jeceris stabit – "whichever way you throw it, it will stand".

== Development ==
The Stabit was invented by Ridehalgh, a senior partner of Sir William Halcrow & Partners, (Note: K. Y. Singh's 1968 paper credits "Mr. Ridehalgh, a partner in his firm and the inventor of the Stabit", and also acknowledges E. J. Daniels and R. K. Hayward for their contribution to its development. An H. Ridehalgh of the same firm was the author of an earlier paper on Shoreham Harbour.) and was patented by the firm.

The first Stabits were experimental units of the "Mark I" design weighing 7 long tons (7.1 t), placed early in 1961 at the end of one of the existing protective moles at Benghazi Harbour, Libya, where they were exposed to open-sea waves. Over about four months the test face received waves of 11 to 12 feet (3.4 to 3.7 m) – higher than the 8 to 10 feet (2.4 to 3.0 m) the units had been designed to resist – and sustained very little damage, dissipating wave energy markedly better than the adjacent pell-mell blockwork. Load testing to destruction, however, showed that the Mark I lacked an adequate reserve of structural strength, and a stronger Mark II design was introduced.

Hydraulic model tests of Mark II units at a scale of 1:47, carried out in 1961 at the Hydraulics Research Station, Wallingford, confirmed that Stabit armour was a satisfactory alternative to other artificial armour, and 29-long-ton (29 t) Stabits were adopted for the reconstruction and extension of the Benghazi moles. After some 2,000 Mark II units had been cast and placed, breakages during placing led to a still more robust Mark III design, which superseded all earlier versions. Further model tests in 1965, using Mark III units, established design coefficients, wave run-up, porosity and armour-layer thickness for a range of breakwater slopes.

== Design ==
The Stabit is essentially a hollow tetrahedron comprising four identical rounded corners; its proportions are related to a basic dimension T, with the volume given by V = 11.34 T^{3}. Its open shape produces a porous armour layer – about 50 per cent voids or more – which dissipates wave energy and limits wave run-up (measured in model tests at about 1.3 times the wave height), while the angular limbs interlock with neighbouring units. Allsop classified the Stabit among the "bulky" interlocking armour units, along with the later French Accropode: units of this class are generally laid in a single layer with close packing and random orientation, and may weigh only around 60 per cent of the plain concrete cube required to resist the same waves.

Stabits are cast without reinforcement in ordinary Portland cement concrete with a specified cube strength of 3,500 psi (24 MPa) at 28 days, using bolted steel moulds of eight elements that can be stripped about 24 hours after casting. Units are lifted by a simple double-sling arrangement that keeps all members in compression, since cast-in lifting hooks can corrode and burst the concrete.

Two placing patterns were developed at Benghazi. In the "double layer" method, units are placed on a predetermined grid in two layers, the upper units sitting in cradles formed by the lower; this is used at the toe of the slope. On slopes of 1:2 and steeper, the "brickwall" pattern is used, in which each succeeding row up the slope is staggered and partly overlaps the row below, in the manner of bonded brickwork, producing a well-interlocked layer about 4T thick.

== Applications ==
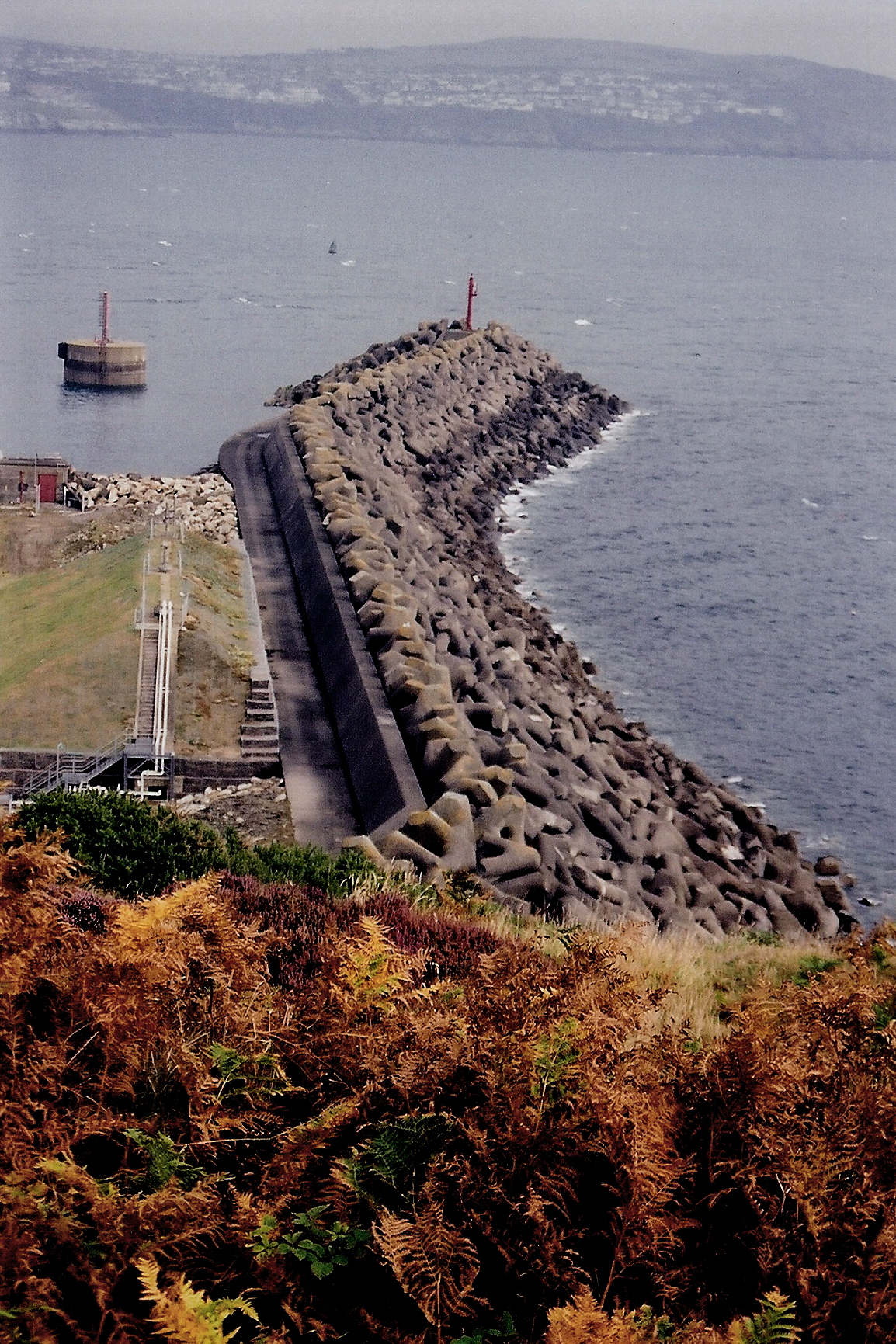
Stabits lining the Douglas Harbour breakwater, Isle of Man

About 10,000 of the 29-long-ton Stabits were used on the reconstructed moles at Benghazi Harbour, with a further 900 seven-long-ton units placed as absorbent facing within the harbour. Wave records showed that the breakwaters were subjected to the design wave several times between 1961 and 1965, with average damage of about half a per cent per annum in the five years to January 1968. In England, about 600 of the smaller units were used in the early 1960s to stabilise the beach at the root of the East Breakwater at Shoreham. From 1968, some 15,000 fifteen-long-ton and 12,000 seven-long-ton Stabits were specified for the breakwaters of Port Rashid, Dubai.

In the early 1980s, 3,740 Stabits of 23 tonnes (23 long tons) were used as the primary armour of the extension of the Douglas Harbour breakwater beyond the Battery Pier on the Isle of Man. One unit stands as a monument on Loch Promenade in Douglas, with a commemorative plaque recording the origin of the name. By the mid-1980s Stabits had been placed on about eleven breakwaters, and Allsop counted the Stabit – with the cube, tetrapod and dolos – among the concrete armour units most commonly used on large breakwaters, judging that in single-layer placement it offered "hydraulically efficient performance with relatively less concrete needed than Tetrapods".

== See also ==
- Accropode
- Dolos
- Tetrapod (structure)
- Xbloc
- Riprap
