= Tetrapod (structure) =

Concrete breakwater element

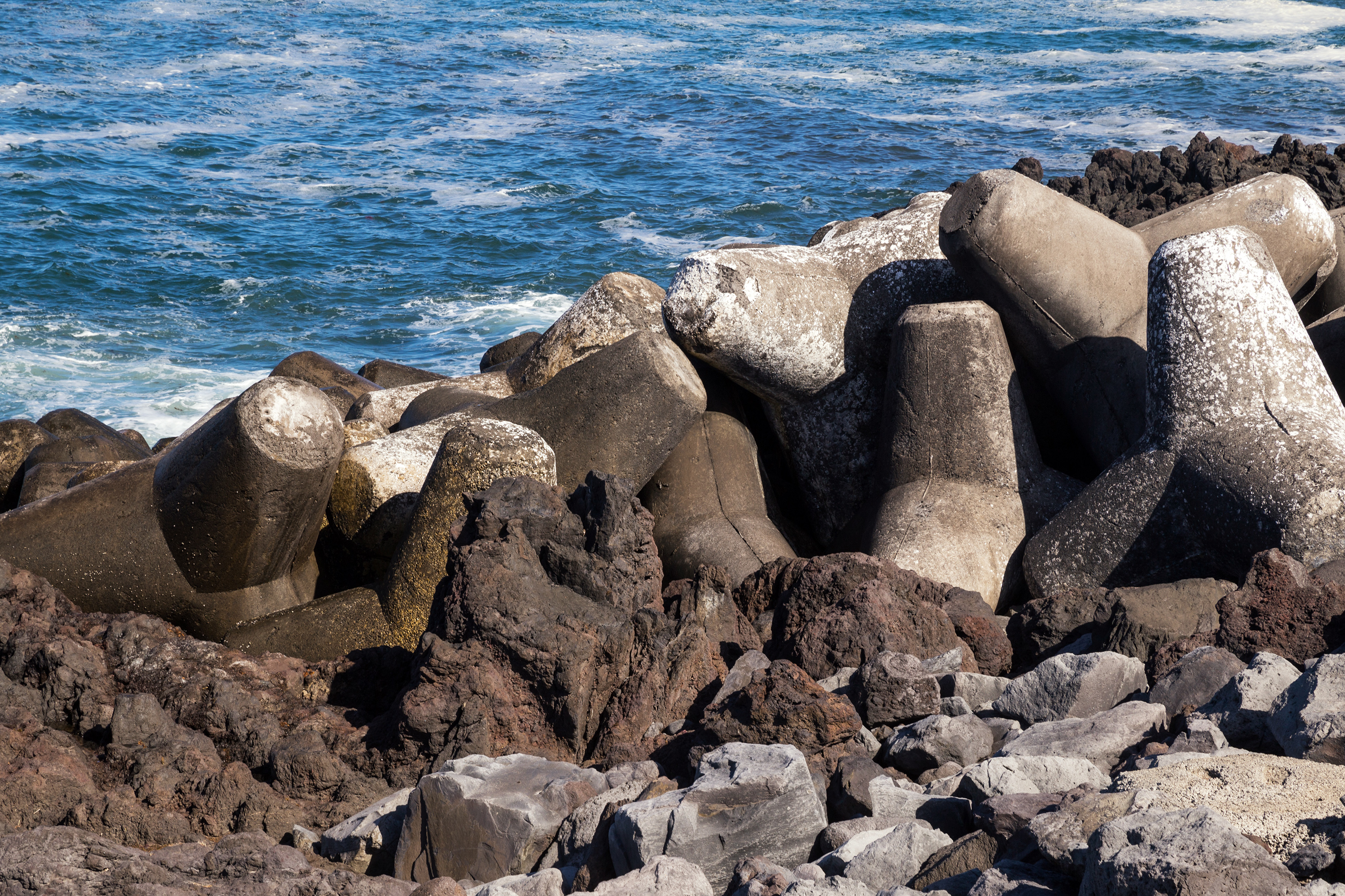
Tetrapods on Graciosa Island, Azores

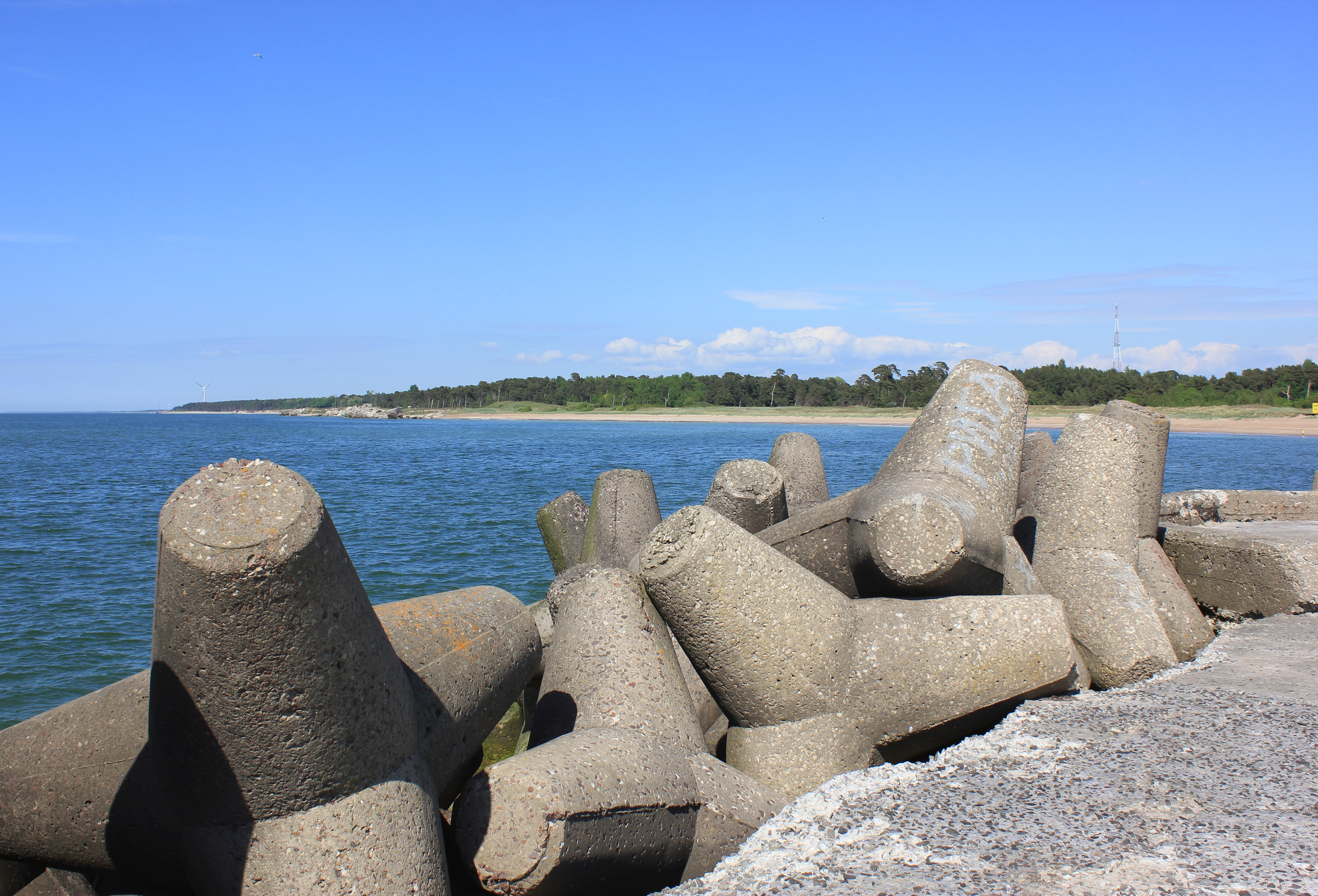
Tetrapods in Latvia

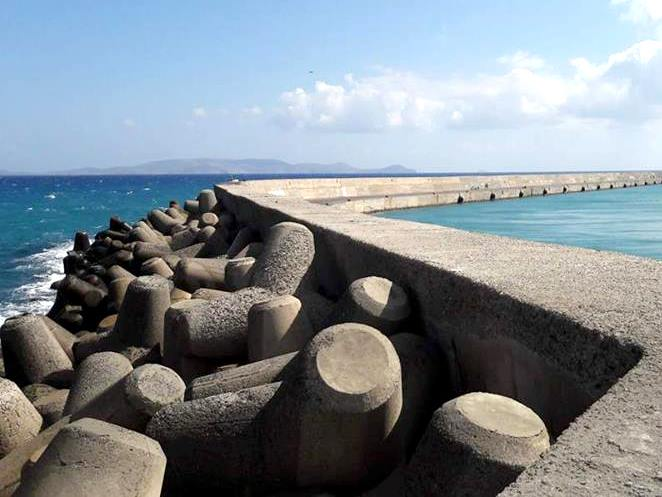
Tetrapods protecting a marina on Crete, Greece.

A tetrapod is a form of wave-dissipating concrete block used to prevent erosion caused by weather and longshore drift, primarily to enforce coastal structures such as seawalls and breakwaters. Tetrapods are made of concrete, and use a tetrahedral shape to dissipate the force of incoming waves by allowing water to flow around rather than against them, and to reduce displacement by interlocking.

== Invention ==
Tetrapods were originally developed in 1950 by Pierre Danel and Paul Anglès d'Auriac of Laboratoire Dauphinois d'Hydraulique (now Artelia) in Grenoble, France, who received a patent for the design. The French invention was named tétrapode, derived from Greek tetra- 'four' and -pode 'foot', a reference to the tetrahedral shape. Tetrapods were first used at the thermal power station in Roches Noires in Casablanca, Morocco, to protect the sea water intake.

== Adoption ==
Monument at Tokumitsu in Hakusan, Japan, described on its plaque as the world's largest tetrapod (80 tonnes)

Tetrapods have become popular across the world, particularly in Japan. In 2007, it was estimated that up to 12 percent of Japan's 35,000-kilometer (22,000 mi) coastline was "semi-natural", defined as having been partially altered by roads or tetrapods. Their proliferation on the island of Okinawa, a popular vacation destination in Japan, has made it difficult for tourists to find unaltered beaches and shoreline, especially in the southern half of the island.

== Similar designs ==
A wave-dissipating concrete block is a naturally or manually interlocking concrete structure designed and employed to minimize the effects of wave action upon shores and shoreline structures, such as quays and jetties.

One of the earliest designs is the Tetrapod, invented in 1950. Other proprietary designs include the Modified Cube (United States, 1959), the Stabit (United Kingdom, 1961), the Akmon (The Netherlands, 1962), the Dolos (South Africa, 1963), the Stabilopod (Romania, 1969), the Seabee (Australia, 1978), the Accropode (France, 1981), the Hollow Cube (Germany, 1991), the A-jack (United States, 1998), the Xbloc (The Netherlands, 2001) and KOLOS (India, 2010) among others.

A similar concept is the Wave Attenuation Device, the term for which is registered to Living Shoreline Solutions. There are at least five similar designs. These devices are akin to other wave-dissipating concrete blocks in that they are blocks, and made of concrete but are different in that they are placed in uniform rows without touching any other blocks. These "WADs" also have a right-side-up and are placed partially submerged near the shore, but not on the shore. These are different from the wide variety of devices that use the more generic term wave attenuator. Some wave attenuators are made of concrete but all of them are floating or neutrally buoyant and not solid ground-resting blocks.

== See also ==
- Artificial reef – Human-made underwater structure that functions as a reef
- Breakwater (structure) – Coastal defense structure
- Caltrop – Area-denial weapon with a similar shape
- Coastal management – Preventing flooding and erosion of shorelines
- Coastal erosion – Displacement of land along the coastline
- Ocean surface wave – Surface waves generated by wind on open water
- Riprap – Rock or concrete protective armour
- Seawall – Form of coastal defence
- Shoal – Natural submerged sandbank that rises from a body of water to near the surface
