= A-Jacks =

Concrete breakwater element

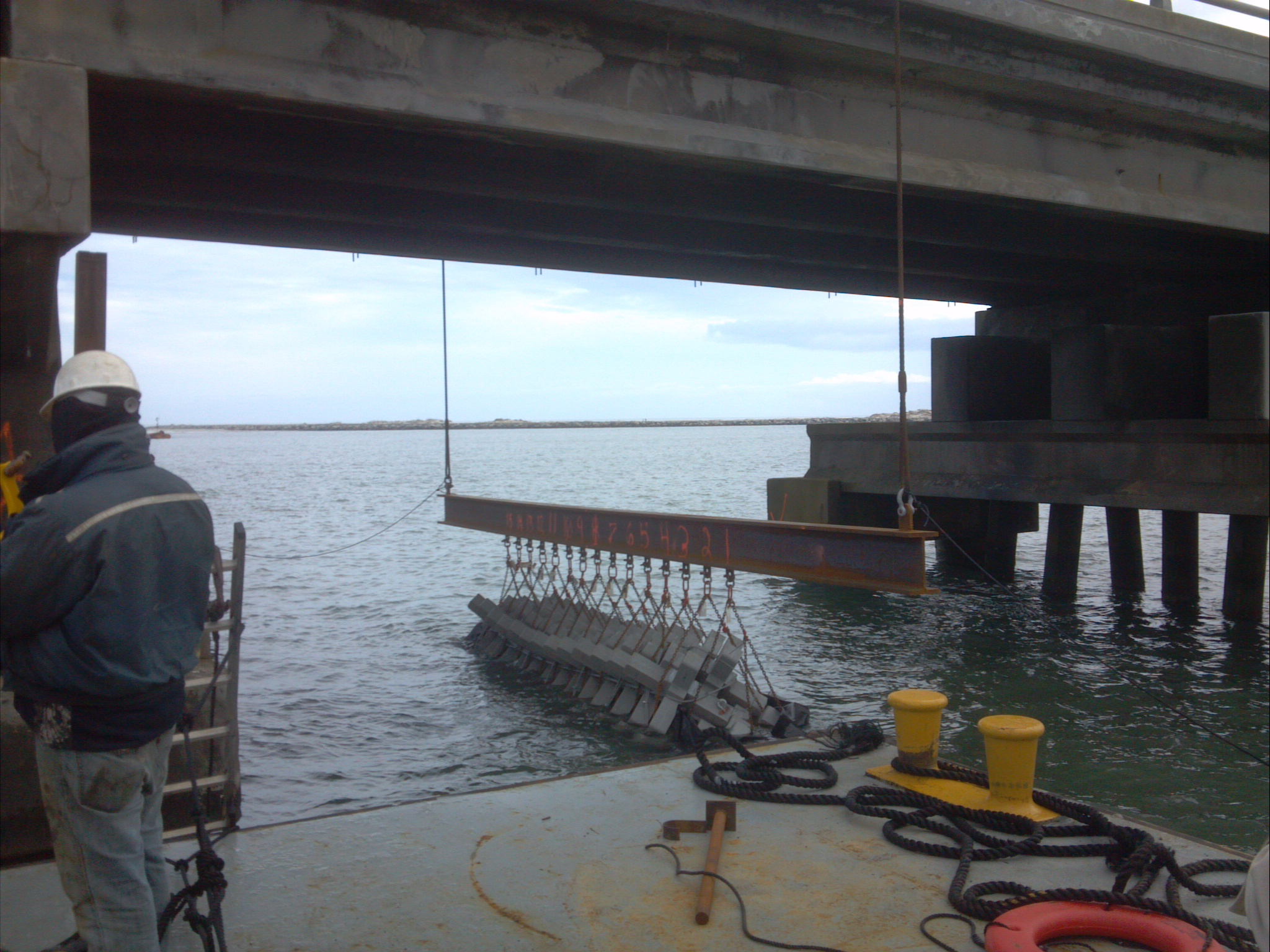
Lowering A-Jacks into place under a bridge. (January 2013)

A-Jacks are a commercially made concrete product used in both open channel and coastal applications. They consist of two concrete T-shaped pieces joined perpendicularly at the middle, forming six legs. They are a product owned and patented worldwide by Poseidon Alliance Ltd.

== Applications ==
Open channel applications include bank stabilization, flow and grade control, scour protection for bridge piers, and biostabilization. The primary mechanism of protection employed is an increase in the relative roughness of the channel bank (as characterized by the Manning's Roughness Coefficient); the Manning's n is relatively high at 0.1. The advantage of A-Jacks over other hard armoring solutions is the comparatively large area available in the interstitial spaces for native vegetation to take root, ultimately helping to restore the stream bank to a more natural state while continuing to protect against erosion.

In coastal applications A-Jacks are used as breakwaters, revetments, artificial reefs, and habitat development. In breakwater applications, A-Jacks can be an economical alternative to quarried rock, which can be both heavier and unwieldy; over the course of a breakwater construction project, the number of transportation cycles to deliver product to the site can be reduced substantially, since A-Jacks are delivered flat on trucks whereas rock rip-rap would be brought in dump trucks. For example, rock can weigh between 150 and 175 lb; a suitable rip-rap boulder comparable to a 96-inch A-Jacks unit (about 36 cubic feet) would weigh about 5800 pounds, about 16% more than the A-Jacks unit. A-Jacks also have the advantage of being interlocking and self-stabilizing. For artificial reefs and habitat development, typical reef-building biota find areas of low turbulence within the open spaces to establish colonies.

== See also ==
- Artificial reef – Human-made underwater structure that functions as a reef
- Breakwater (structure) – Coastal defense structure
- Gabion – Cage full of rock
- KOLOS – Concrete breakwater element
- Wave-dissipating concrete block – Shoreline defense
- Xbloc – Concrete breakwater element
