= Aubrey Kruger =

South African draughtsman and inventor

- Born: 21 July 1935
- Died: 19 July 2016 (aged 80); East London, Eastern Cape, South Africa
- Citizenship: South African
- Occupation: Draughtsman
- Known for: Inventing the Dolos
- Spouse: Daphne Margaret Bright

Aubrey Kruger (21 July 1935 – 19 July 2016) was a South African draughtsman and inventor.

== Working life ==
He worked as a draughtsman for the South African Railways and Harbours Administration in East London, Eastern Cape, until 1966. He was then transferred to Durban. In 1973 he moved to East London, Eastern Cape and started a tyre retreading company. In his later years he worked as a draughtsman for an architectural company. After that he became a truss designer for a timber company.

== Invention ==
Eric Mowbray Merrifield is credited for the invention of the "Dolos", a concrete block used to stop coastal erosion. However, Kruger countered that claim by claiming that he was the inventor of the "Dolos" and that he had done so in 1963 after being instructed by the South African Railways and Harbours Administration to find a solution for the sea eroding the harbour. The block is reinforced in a complex shape weighing between 80 and 88 tonnes. It is used all over the world in harbours

== Personal life ==
He married Daphne Margaret Bright (b. 6 May 1937) on 1 February 1958 and they had four children. He died after a stroke in his house in East London, Eastern Cape.
