= Akmon =

Concrete breakwater element

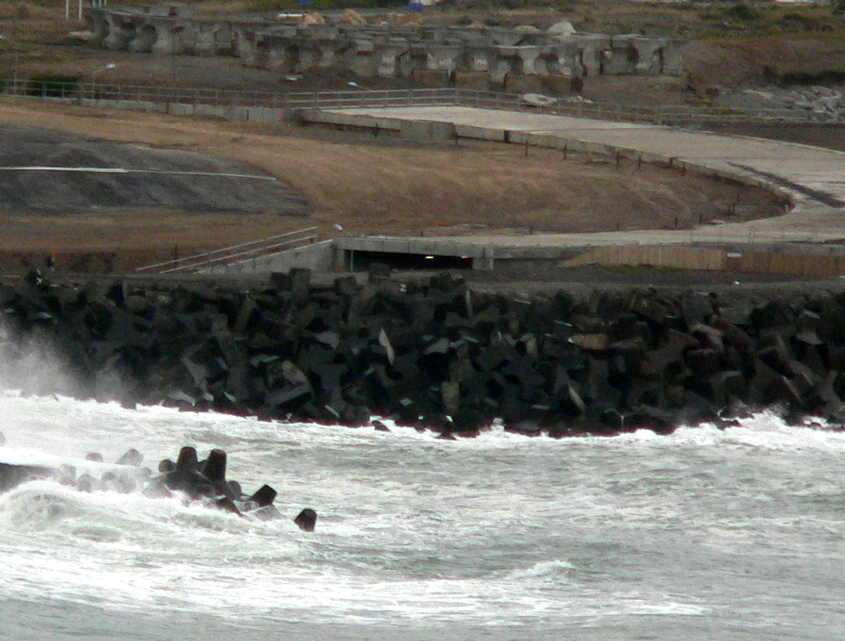
Akmons protecting the runway at Wellington International Airport from Cook Strait.

An akmon is a multi-ton concrete block used for breakwater and seawall armouring. It was originally designed in the Netherlands in the 1960s, as an improvement on the tetrapod.

== See also ==
- Wave-dissipating concrete block
