= Dolos =

Concrete breakwater element

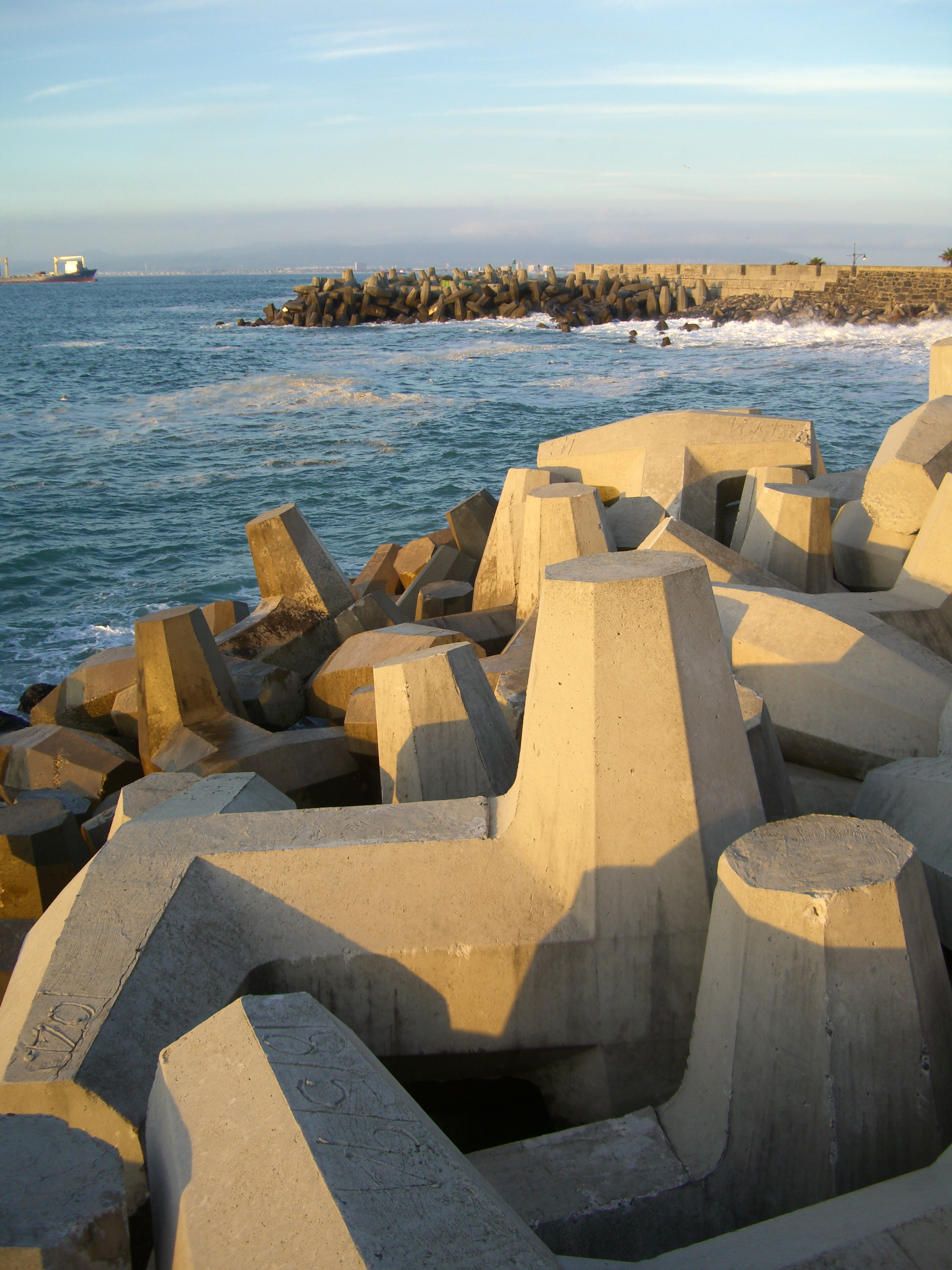
Dolosse forming a protective structure against a shoreline in Cape Town, South Africa.

A dolos (plural: dolosse) is a wave-dissipating concrete block used in great numbers as a form of coastal management. It is a type of tetrapod. Weighing up to 8 tonnes (8.8 short tons), dolosse are used to build revetments for protection against the erosive force of waves from a body of water. The dolos was invented in 1963, and was first deployed in 1964 on the breakwater of East London, a South African port city.

== Construction ==
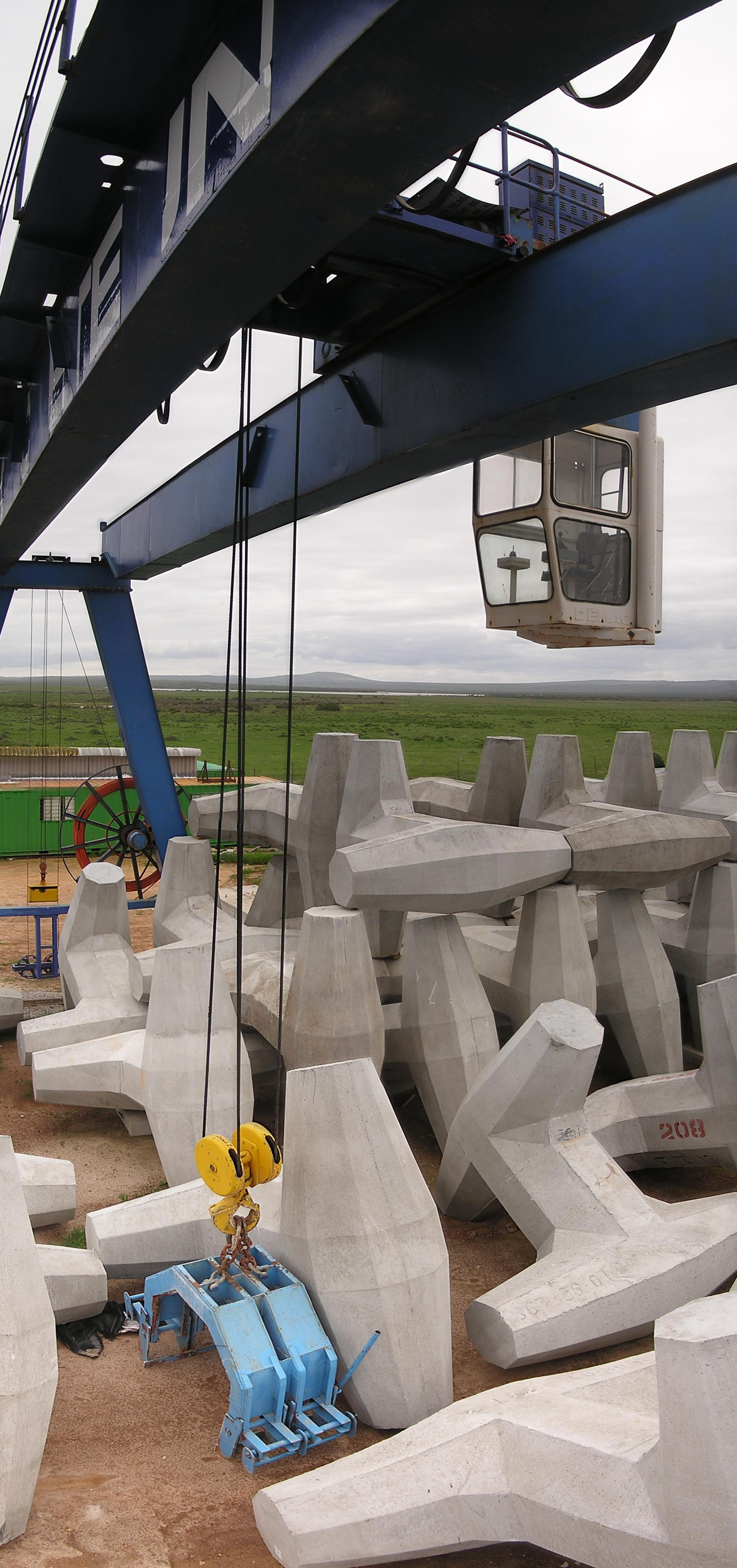
Dolos construction yard - Yzerfontein, South Africa.

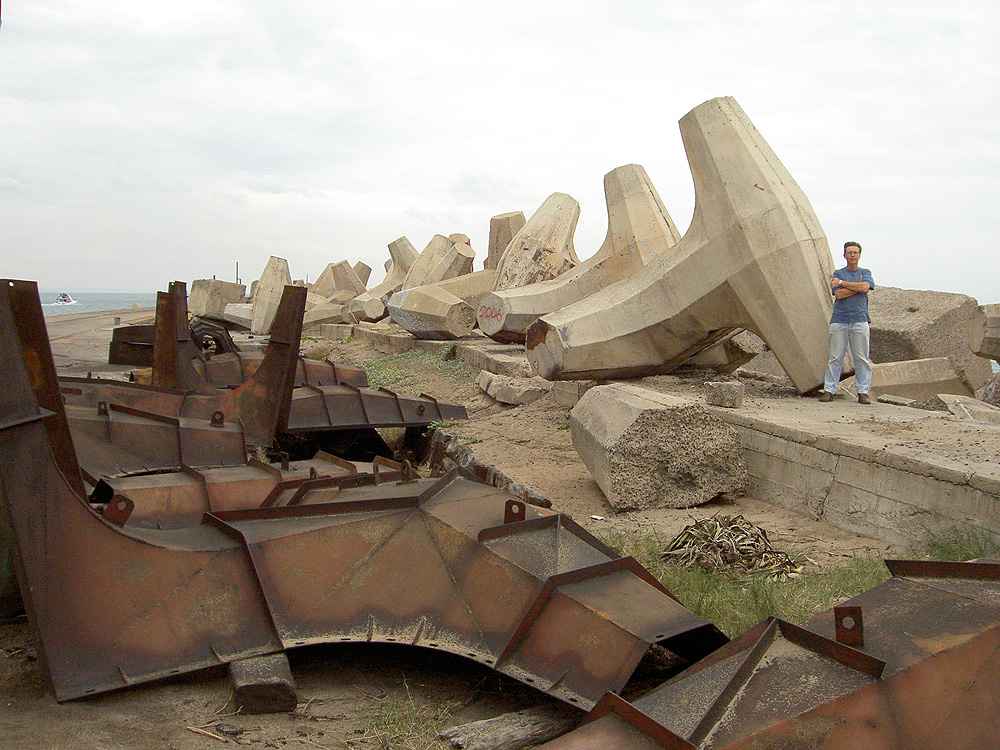
A man stands next to a dolos, showing its relative size. Dolosse moulds are in the foreground - Durban, South Africa.

Dolosse are normally made from non-reinforced concrete, poured into a steel mould. The concrete will sometimes be mixed with small steel fibers to strengthen it in the absence of reinforcement.

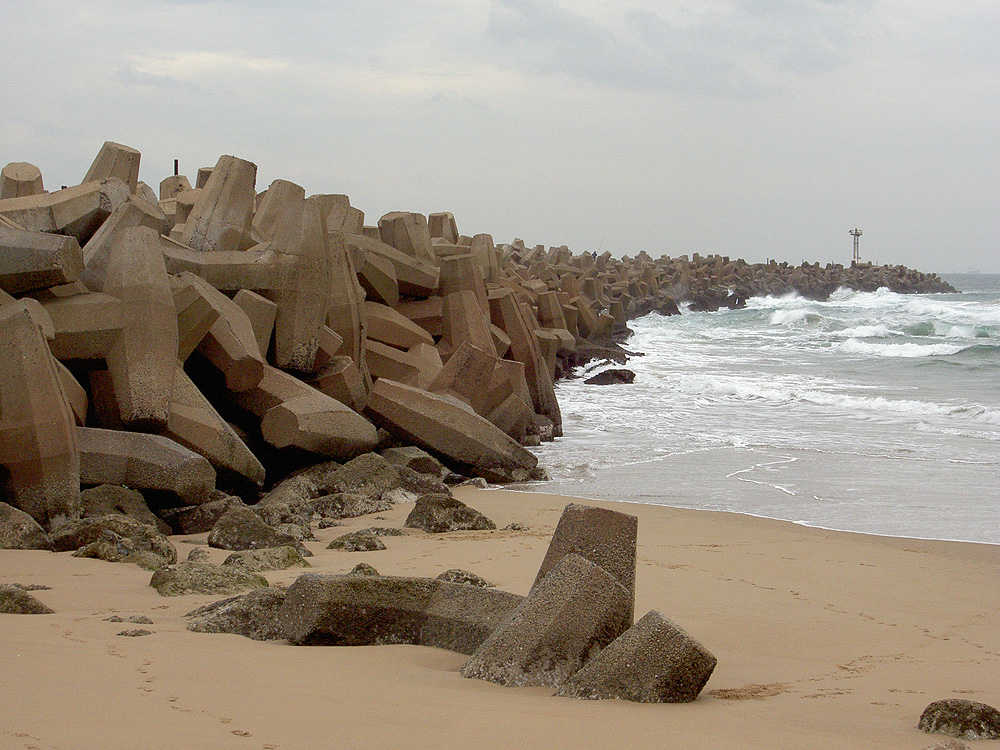
Durban's South Pier with a line of interlocking dolosse, South Africa.

They are used to protect harbour walls, breakwaters and shore earthworks. In Dania Beach, Florida, dolosse are used as an artificial reef known as the Dania Beach Erojacks. They are also used to trap sea-sand to prevent erosion. Roughly 10,000 dolosse are required for a kilometre of coastline.

They work by dissipating, rather than blocking, the energy of waves. Their design deflects most wave action energy to the side, making them more difficult to dislodge than objects of a similar weight presenting a flat surface. Though they are placed into position on top of each other by cranes, over time they tend to get further entangled as the waves shift them. Their design ensures that they form an interlocking but porous and slightly flexible wall.

The individual units are often numbered so that their movements can be tracked. This helps engineers gauge whether they need to add more dolosse to the pile.

Dolosse are also being used in rivers in the Pacific Northwest of the United States of America, to control erosion, prevent channel migration and to create and restore salmon habitat. Examples are engineered log jams, or ELJs, that may aid in efforts to save stocks of salmon. The sheer mass of the dolosse provides ballast for logs and slash ("wrack" or "rack" organic debris) to create a stable, complex habitat structure, all the while precluding the need for excessive, environmentally-invasive and costly excavation for their placement into substrate.

== Credit for invention ==
The design of the dolos is usually credited to the South African Eric Mowbray Merrifield, one-time East London Harbour Engineer (from 1961–1976). Eric Merrifield lead a team which included Piet Grobbelaar and Jack Badham-Thornhill who collaborated for many years perfecting the design. These blocks were designed to 22 tonne in later years. In the late 1990s the claim of Aubrey Kruger gained more prominence. Kruger's claim is that he and Merrifield had considered the shape of concrete blocks to be used to protect East London's extensive breakwaters for the City's non-natural harbour, following a major storm in 1963. Merrifield wished to design a block that did not break up or shift when struck by the sea; that was cheap; and that did not require precise placement. He said in later years that he wanted a block designed in such a way that it could be "sprinkled like children's jacks". Kruger stated that he went home for lunch, cut three sections from a broomstick, and fastened them with nails into an H-shape with one leg turned through 90 degrees to create the distinctive dolos shape. Merrifield was intrigued by the object and had Kruger draw a plan. Kruger never formally received credit for the invention. Merrifield won the Shell Design Award and the Associated Science and Technology Societies of South Africa's Gold Medal. The death of Merrifield (in 1982) has put this controversy beyond proof either way.

Aubrey Kruger died in East London on 19 July 2016.

== Design protection ==
The design of the dolos is not protected by any form of patent. Merrifield did not take the necessary steps to protect the concept.

The reason for this is uncertain. Two reasons for this have been put forward: one by Merrifield; the other by Kruger. Merrifield stated that he did not protect them as he wished them to benefit humanity. Kruger alleges that Merrifield received incorrect legal advice: to wit, that as the blocks had been designed during office hours while he was employed by the State (South African Railways and Harbours Administration), he was unable by law to protect their design.

== Origin of name ==
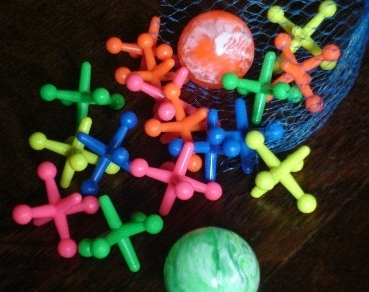
Plastic playing pieces from the game Jacks.

The name is derived from the Afrikaans word dolos (plural: dolosse). This word has two given derivations. Rosenthal (1961) states it to be a contraction of 'dobbel osse', or 'gambling' (Afrikaans) 'bones' (from Latin). Boshof and Nienaber state it to be a contraction of 'dollen os', or 'play' (old Dutch) 'oxen' (Afrikaans). The first is a meaning-shifted reference to knucklebones used in divination practices by sangomas, Southern African traditional healers. The second is a reference to the knucklebones used by African children to play. The name was attached to the objects when Kruger's father, Joe Kruger, who also worked in the harbour, came upon his son and others playing with small models of the objects and asked him Wat speel julle met die dolos? (English: What are you playing at with the dolos?).

== See also ==
- Riprap
- Humboldt Bay – Bay on the North Coast of California – jetties were reinforced using dolosse in the 1980s maintaining the entrance at one of the world's most treacherous harbor entrances
- Czech hedgehog – Static anti-tank obstacle defense
- Xbloc – Concrete breakwater element
- KOLOS – Concrete breakwater element based on dolosse
- Tetrapod – Concrete breakwater element
- Accropode – Concrete breakwater element
