= Wave-dissipating concrete block =

Shoreline defense

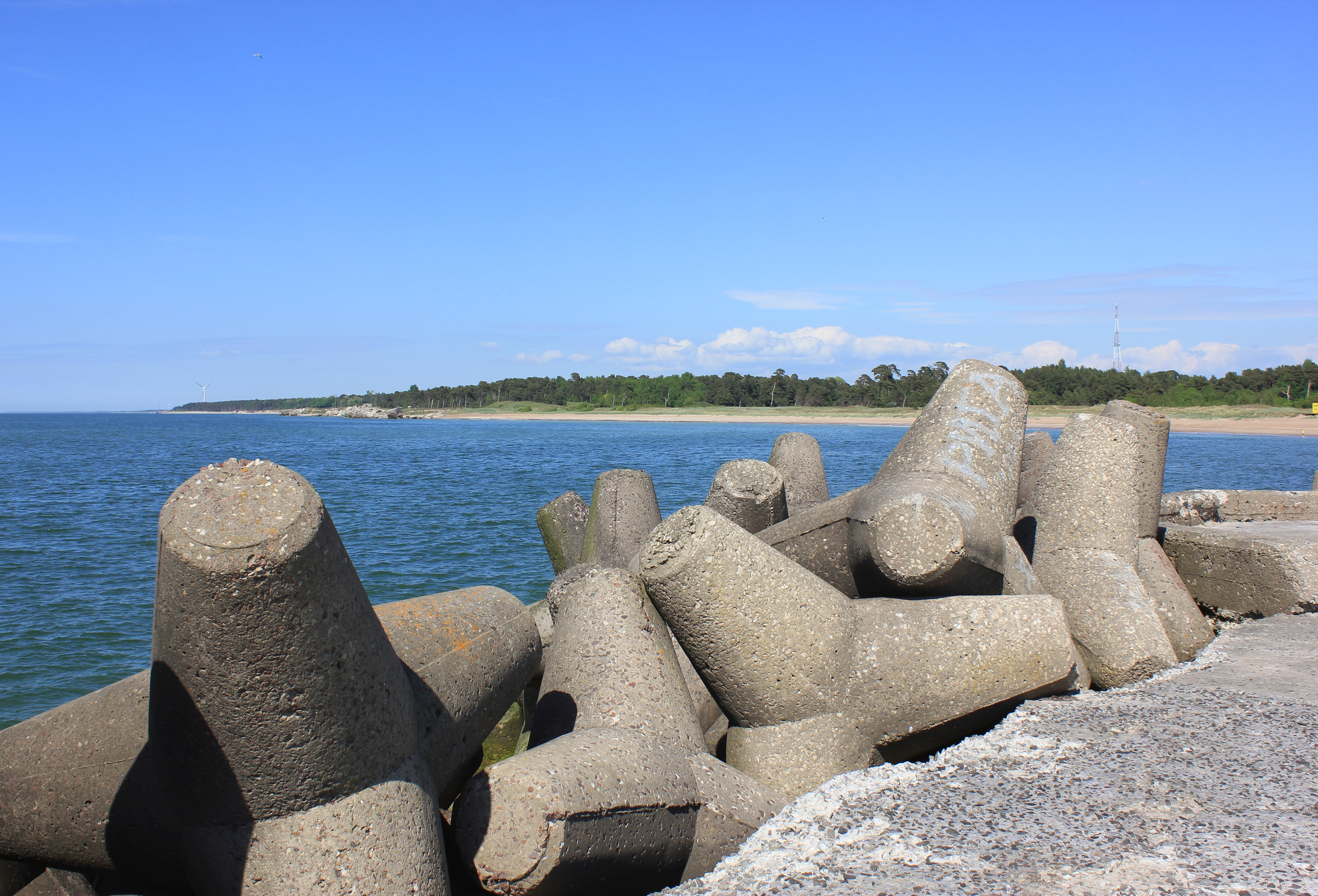
Tetrapods used to protect a seawall

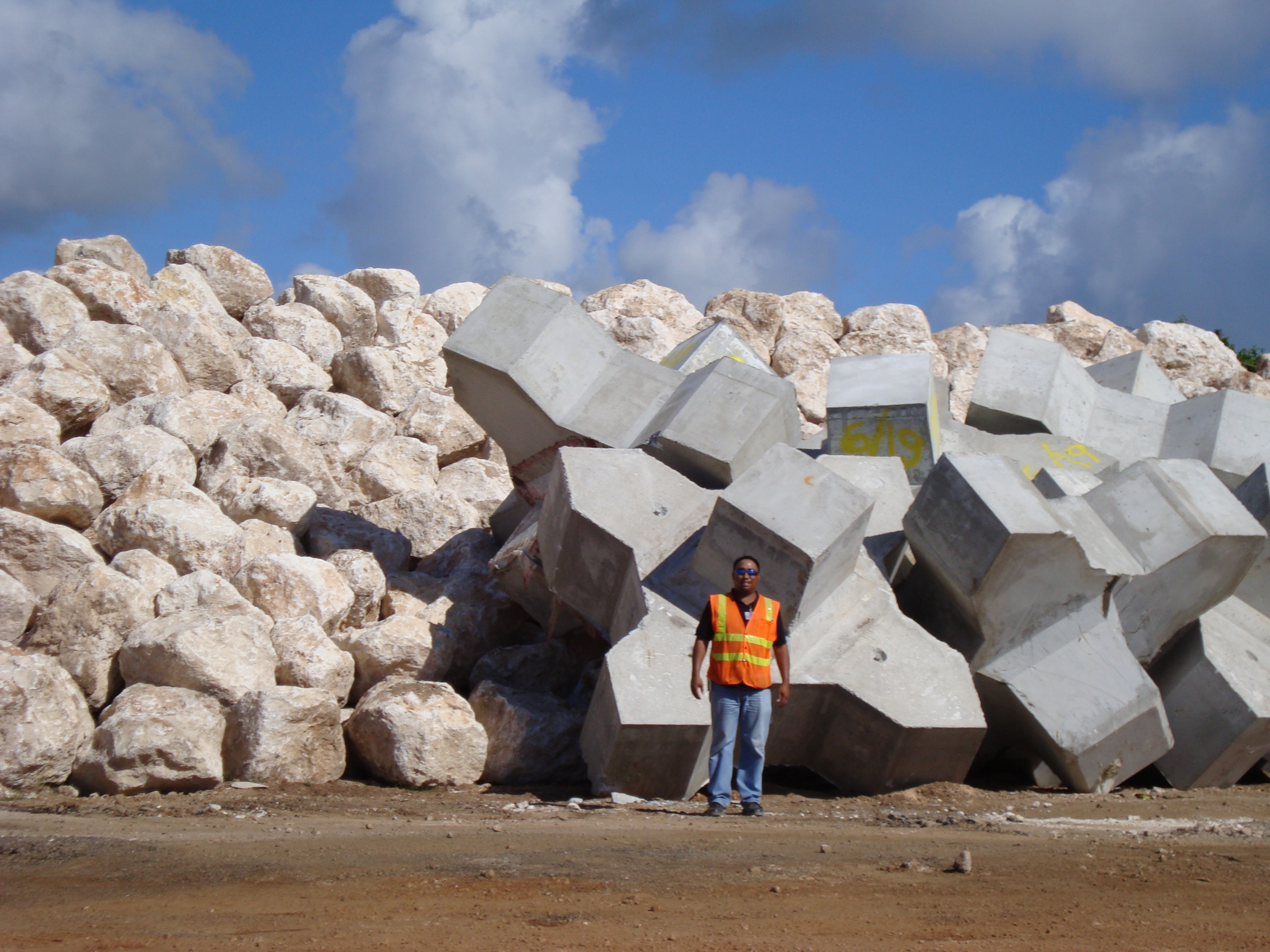
Large interlocked Xblocs (8.0 m^{3} or 280 cu ft) in a trial placement

A wave-dissipating concrete block is a naturally or manually interlocking concrete structure designed and employed to minimize the effects of wave action upon shores and shoreline structures, such as quays and jetties.

One of the earliest designs is the Tetrapod, invented in 1950. Other proprietary designs include the Modified Cube (United States, 1959), the Stabit (United Kingdom, 1961), the Akmon (The Netherlands, 1962), the Dolos (South Africa, 1963), the Stabilopod (Romania, 1969), the Seabee (Australia, 1978), the Accropode (France, 1981), the Hollow Cube (Germany, 1991), the A-jack (United States, 1998), the Xbloc (The Netherlands, 2001) and KOLOS (India, 2010) among others.

A similar concept is the Wave Attenuation Device, the term for which is registered to Living Shoreline Solutions. There are at least five similar designs. These devices are akin to other wave-dissipating concrete blocks in that they are blocks, and made of concrete but are different in that they are placed in uniform rows without touching any other blocks. These "WADs" also have a right-side-up and are placed partially submerged near the shore, but not on the shore. These are different from the wide variety of devices that use the more generic term wave attenuator. Some wave attenuators are made of concrete but all of them are floating or neutrally buoyant and not solid ground-resting blocks.

== See also ==
- Artificial reef – Human-made underwater structure that functions as a reef
- Breakwater (structure) – Coastal defense structure
- Coastal management – Preventing flooding and erosion of shorelines
- Coastal erosion – Displacement of land along the coastline
- Ocean surface wave – Surface waves generated by wind on open water
- Riprap – Rock or concrete protective armour
- Seawall – Form of coastal defence
