= KOLOS =

Concrete breakwater element

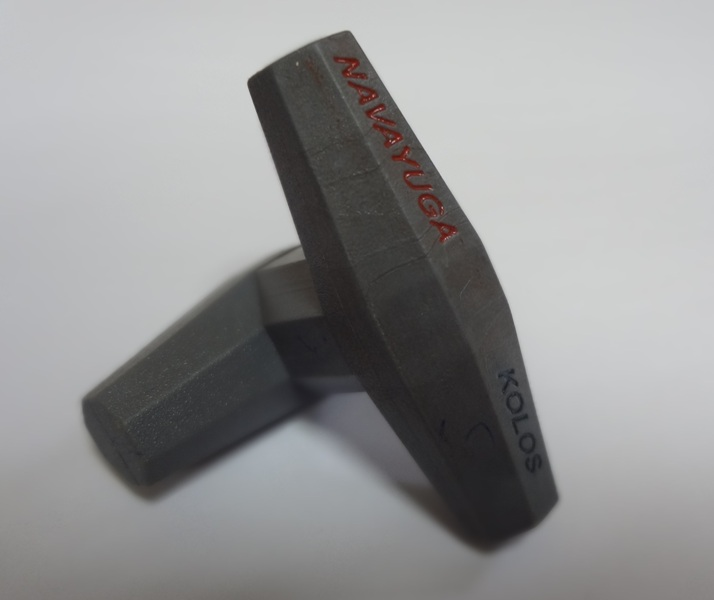
KOLOS interlocking concrete armour block

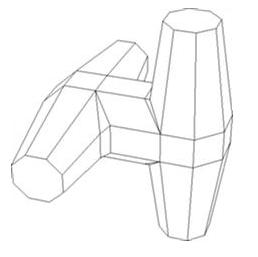
3D view of KOLOS

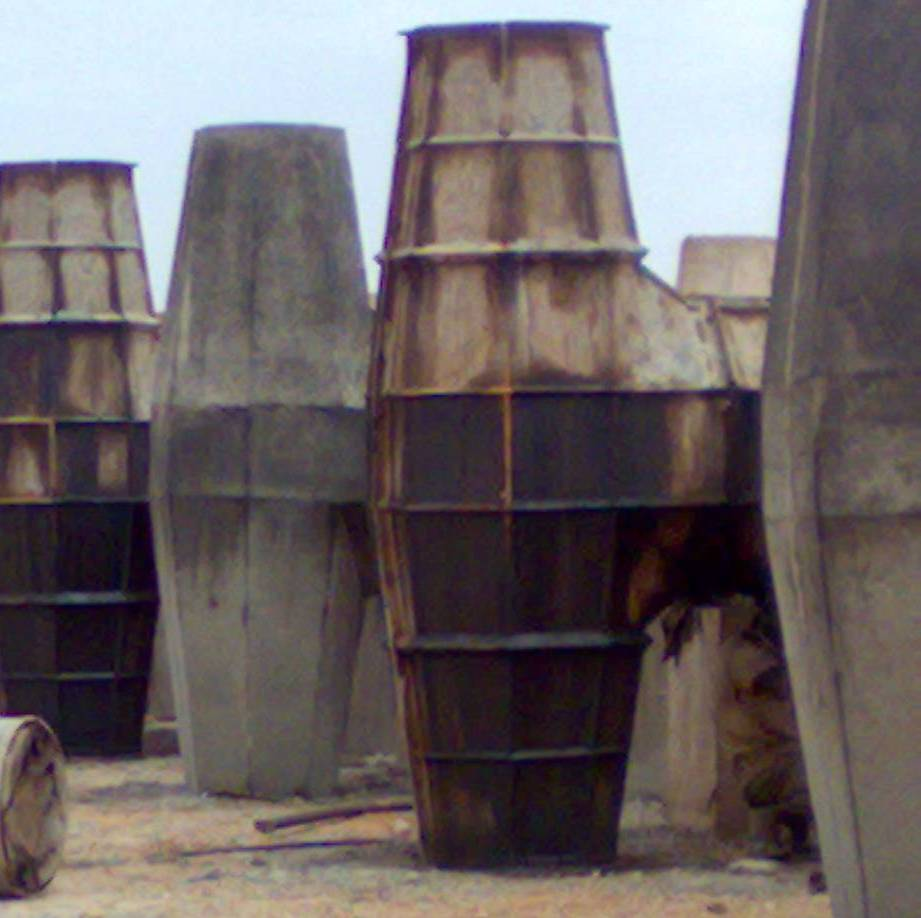
KOLOS units being cast

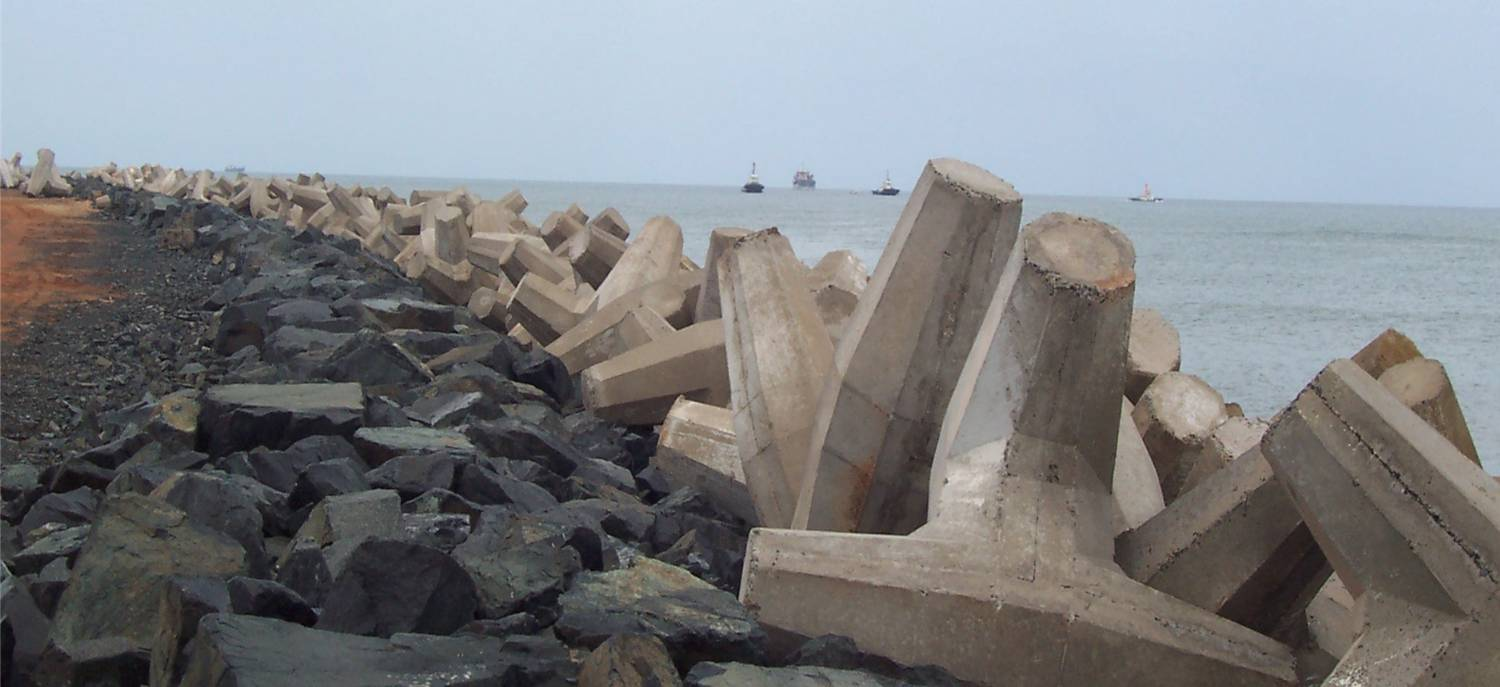
KOLOS units at Krishnapatnam Port Breakwater

KOLOS is a wave-dissipating concrete block intended to protect coastal structures like seawalls and breakwaters from the ocean waves. These blocks were developed by the Navayuga Engineering Company Ltd and were first adopted for the breakwaters of the Krishnapatnam Port along the East coast of India.

== Design ==
KOLOS has been conceptualized by incorporating structural improvements to existing armour units, Dolos. The common failure modes for Dolos were found to be either at the shank due to torsion and at the fluke by bending-induced shear. The higher structural stresses are caused largely due to the longer lever arm. The elongated shank length of the Dolos was shrunken by 21.4% in KOLOS. The material thus saved compensates for thickening the legs of KOLOS.

KOLOS is characterized by a central shorter concrete member and two outer elongate concrete members connected on opposites sides of the central member. The outer members have parallel longitudinal axes extending normal to the longitudinal axis of the central member. These members have an octagonal cross-section and are further configured such that their cross-sectional area decreases from its intermediate portion towards opposite ends thereof.

== Casting and transportation ==
KOLOS are fabricated using plain cement concrete. To fabricate KOLOS, three piece steel moulds are used which facilitate easy de-moulding. De-moulding is usually carried out after 24 hours of concrete casting.

A single KOLOS unit can weigh from 1.5 tons to 12 tons.

Lifting the units is done after three days of curing. The units are transferred from the casting bed to the stacking yard. Lifting of the units is done by slinging and hoisting with a crane. Trucks are used for the short haul to the breakwater.

== Placement ==
KOLOS are randomly placed on rubble mound breakwaters in two layers. Like most of the concrete armour units, the hydraulic stability of KOLOS is dictated by its self weight and interlocking with surrounding units. KOLOS is found to have almost the same level of porosity as Dolos with a layer coefficient of 1. The random placement of the units facilitates increased rate of placement and less dependence on complex placement techniques. A damage level of 0.5% is allowable in the design of KOLOS armour layer without inflicting damage to the underlayers of the breakwater.

== See also ==
- Artificial reef – Human-made underwater structure that functions as a reef
- Breakwater (structure) – Coastal defense structure
- Coastal management – Preventing flooding and erosion of shorelines
- Coastal erosion – Displacement of land along the coastline
- Ocean surface wave – Surface waves generated by wind on open water
- Seawall – Form of coastal defence
- Xbloc – Concrete breakwater element
- Dolos – Concrete breakwater element from which the KOLOS is derived
- Tetrapod – Concrete breakwater element
- Accropode – Concrete breakwater element
