= Artelia =

French design company

- Type: Société par actions simplifiée
- Industry: Engineering
- Founded: 2010
- Founder: Alain Bentejac, Jacques Gaillard
- Headquarters: Saint-Ouen-sur-Seine, France
- Area served: Worldwide
- Key people: Alain Bentejac (co-president); Jacques Gaillard (co-president); Benoit Clocheret (CEO)
- Revenue: €745 million
- Owner: Managers and Employees: 100%
- Number of employees: 7300
- Website: www.arteliagroup.com

Artelia is a French design firm specializing in engineering, project management, and consultancy. Launched in 2010, Artelia is active building construction, water, energy, environment, industry, maritime operations, transportation, urban development, and multi-site projects. The group also participates in public-private partnership. Artelia is ranked 83rd among international design firms.

== History ==
Coteba was founded in 1961 as a subsidiary of Compagnie Générale des Eaux. It was known as one of the leading French companies specializing in project management of large-scale building construction projects. Coteba expanded its activities to include engineering, transportation and major urban infrastructure. Coteba was also known for managing multi-site projects for international clients.

In 1995, Coteba became part of Nexity. In 2003, Coteba's management and specialized funds Crédit Mutuel-CIC and Crédit Agricole acquired Coteba from Nexity. In 2006, Coteba acquired, for an undisclosed price, the engineering departments of Thales Engineering & Consutlting (THEC), which specialize in infrastructure, building construction—in particular hospitals—and industrial processes. Coteba recruited an additional 300 workers, an increase of 40% of its 700 staff size at the time. In 2007, Coteba's entire share capital was taken over by its management. Between 2003 and 2007, Coteba's staff size doubled.

=== Sogreah ===
Sogreah was founded in 1923 when the Laboratoire Dauphinois d’Hydraulique was built in Grenoble. In 1955, the laboratory renamed itself Société Grenobloise d’Etudes et d’Applications Hydrauliques (Sogreah). Sogreah specialised in design studies and construction projects in the field of hydraulics. It has a hydraulics physical scale model laboratory, a shiphandling training centre, and a range of numerical models. In 1958, the company moved into rural engineering, irrigation, water supplies and sewerage systems. Sogreah also operated in the water, energy, the environment and urban development sectors. It participated in the design of the tidal power station on the River Rance in France and developed the tetrapod, a concrete breakwater armouring block. In 1967, Sogreah became part of the Alstom group, which subsequently became Alcatel. On 31 December 1998, Sogreah become an independently held company via a MBO, after which its staff size tripled to over 1200 employees.

=== Merger ===
In July 2009, a merger between Coteba and Sogreah was announced. At the end of 2009, a memorandum of agreement was signed by the two firms defining their merger into a holding company named Artelia. In 2011, the merger was completed.

=== Artelia ===
Artelia's development since its foundation has consisted of internal and external growth. Between 2010 and 2013, 12 companies joined the group. At the beginning of 2010, Sodeg, a building engineering consultancy specialising in healthcare, industrial, educational, cultural and leisure facilities, joined the group as it was being founded. In April 2011, Artelia acquired Spretec, an engineering firm specialising in structural mechanics, and in May 2011, Détente Consultants, a consultancy firm specialising in tourism.

In 2012, the group completed six acquisitions, adding 200 new employees to its workforce and extra turnover of €23 million for a complete financial year. It first acquired the technical design firms GECC AICC, RL Consultant and Ingetech, building construction specialists in the Rhône-Alpes region of France that design institutional kitchens. In March 2012, Artelia acquired UK-based building form Appleyards, which provides project management and consultancy services for construction and infrastructure projects on behalf of clients. In April 2012, the group acquired Sotec, a former subsidiary of the Systra group that specialised in water, the environment and urban development. In May 2012, Artelia acquired DPG Plan in São Paulo, Brazil, specialising in engineering, architecture and project management in construction and infrastructure. In September 2012, Artelia acquired Copramex, which specialises in coastal environment studies around the Mediterranean Sea and in polluted soil remediation. In November 2012, the group acquired Haskoning France, which specialises in polluted site and soil rehabilitation, industrial risks and sustainable management of natural resources.

In April 2013, Artelia acquired ICADE's engineering department, consisting of Arcoba, Gestec and Setrhi-Setae, thereby strengthening its building construction and industrial facilities sector and making it the French leader in the field. The same year, the group consolidated the range of its infrastructure engineering services by acquiring Secoa and Quadric, specialists in civil engineering structures.

In July 2015, the World Bank Group announced the debarment of two Artelia business units from participation in World Bank projects in relation to fraudulent practices in some of its projects in China. The settlement was agreed following acknowledgment of misconduct by Artelia Group.

== Organisation ==
Artelia's operational organisation consists of nine "business units": •Bâtiments Ile-de-France •-Bâtiments régions & équipements •Mobilités & infrastructures •Villes & territoires •Europe & Retail •Asie, Inde, Amérique •Eau & Afrique Moyen-Orient •Industrie •MOE (Denmark) It has 55 branch offices in France and offices in 40 countries. In 2019 the group's international turnover represented 36% of the group total.

== Notable projects ==
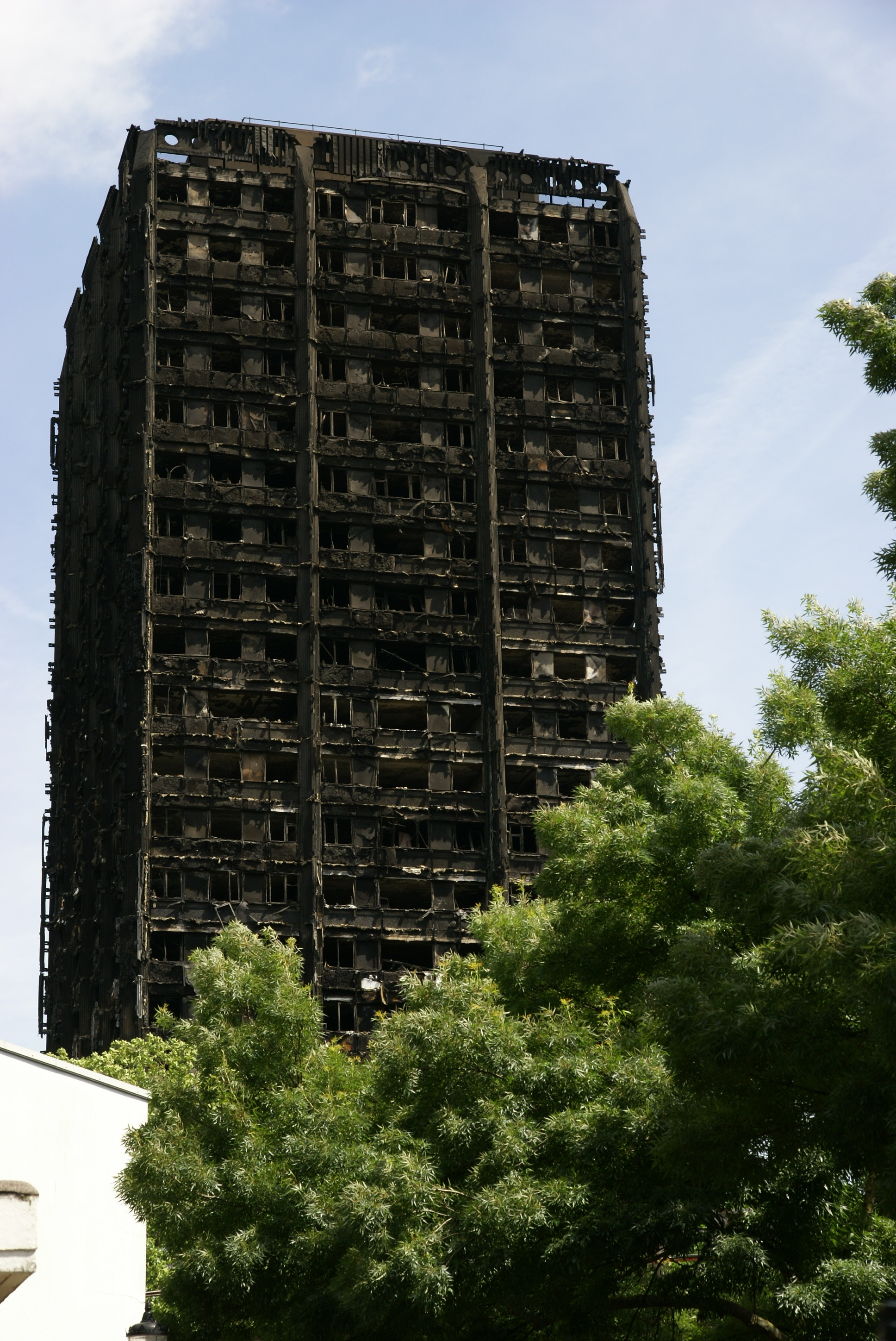
Grenfell Tower in 2017

Following is a selection of recent, notable projects led by Artelia in France and elsewhere:

- Grenfell Tower – Artelia was commissioned to manage the renovation of Grenfell Tower, a now-disused 24-storey residential tower block in North Kensington, London, England. In 2017, the flammable cladding installed during this renovation, alongside unaddressed previous safety concerns, resulted in a fire which killed 72 people.
- Extension of Safran site in Gennevilliers, France: Safran is in the fields of forging, casting and the machining of aircraft parts. It chose Artelia to provide design and construction supervision services for the extension, asbestos removal operations and rehabilitation of the production workshops, laboratories and offices.
- Forum des Halles in Paris. Created 30 years ago, Les Halles is an underground urban development monument in central Paris. It is the principal gateway to the city, handling 750,000 people a day. A redevelopment scheme is currently underway to improve its operation and accessibility, and integrate it more effectively into the city. Artelia is providing project management and general coordination services for this project.
- Grand Paris Express in the Paris region of France: The Grand Paris Express project involves the construction of four new driverless metro lines and the extension of existing ones. Nearly 200 km of new lines and 75 stations are to be built by 2030. Artelia is assisting the Société du Grand Paris and STIF with this project.
- Renovation of the hôtel de Crillon in Place de la Concorde, Paris, since 2012.
- Nickel Mine in Goro, New Caledonia: Vale Inco Nouvelle-Calédonie, a subsidiary of the Vale mining group, is developing an opencast nickel mine at Goro, since 2010.
- Hydropower project in Boureya, Guinea for the Senegal River Basin Development Authority (OMVS). The earthfill dam will be 60 m high and 1.5 km long, and will supply a 160 MW power plant providing electricity to 120 km of transmission lines.
- Calais Port 2015 in Calais, France: Artelia is providing engineering services for the Calais 2015 project managed by the Nord-Pas-de-Calais regional authorities. The project includes the creation of a new 60 ha harbour basin sheltered by a 3.6 km long breakwater, a 100 ha reclamation area and a service harbour for tugs.
- Drinking water networks in the Muscat Governorate, Oman: PAEW, the Public Authority for Electricity and Water, has awarded Artelia Oman a contract to supervise the construction of the drinking water networks in the Governorate of Muscat.
- Royal Dutch Shell and its service station network: Shell renewed its partnership agreement with Artelia International for a further three years. This involves managing investments in its fuel distribution network. The new contract concerns 11 countries, mainly in Europe.

== Bibliography ==
- Anne Dalmasso, SOGRÉAH (Société Grenobloise d’Études et d’Applications Hydrauliques) : du laboratoire à l’ingénierie indépendante (1923–2010), Entreprises et histoire, 2013/2, N°71, p. 23 – 38
