= Accropode =

Concrete breakwater element

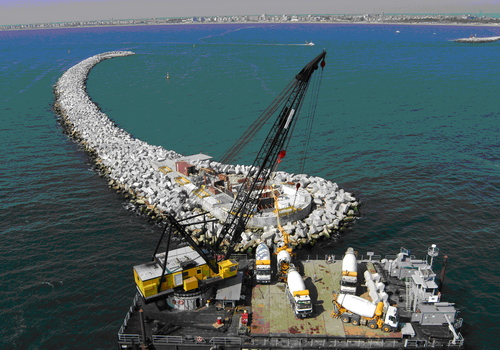
Large accropode units are lowered into a position offshore by aid of a crane.

Accropode blocks are wave-dissipating concrete blocks designed to resist the action of waves on breakwaters and coastal structures.

== History ==
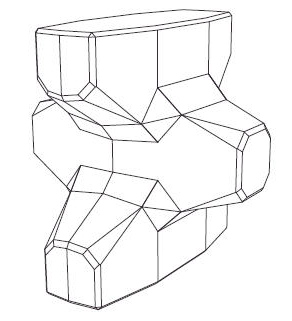
Accropode (1981)

The Accropode is a single-layer artificial armour unit developed by Sogreah in 1981. Accropode concrete armour units are applied in a single layer.

Ecopode (1996)

The Ecopode armour unit with a rock-like appearance was developed by Sogreah to enhance the natural appearance of concrete armourings above low water level. A patent application was filed in 1996. The color and type of rock-like appearance can be specified to match the surrounding landscape.

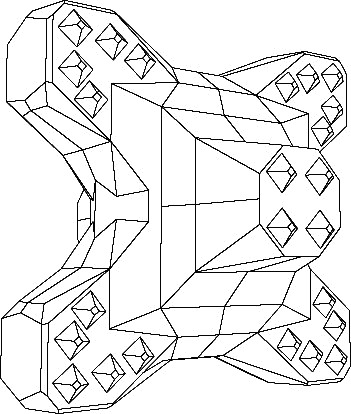
Accropode II (2004)

In 1999, Sogreah modified the original Accropode shape by chipping away excess materials and adding friction features in the form of small pyramids. A patent application was filed for this modified shape. In 2004 further modifications to the 1999 shape were made, resulting in the Accropode II. The shape modifications are intended to increase interlocking.

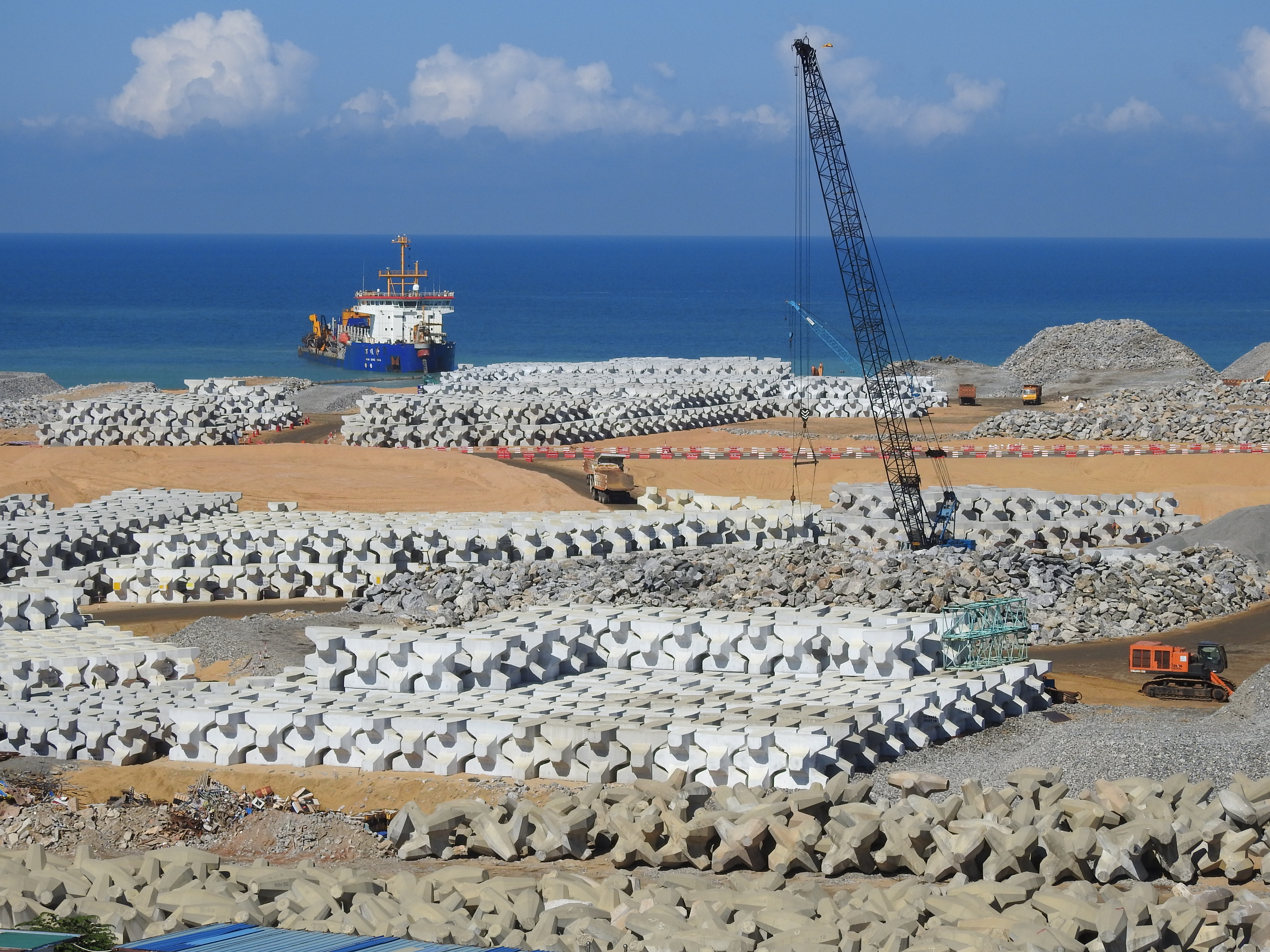
Storage of Chinapods for Colombo Port City

Accropodes are not produced by the patent holder, but are fabricated and installed by a contractor who in return pays a license fee. Such an agreement involves certain technical support activities to ensure the correct application of the protection system. After the patent has expired (like it is for the Accropode I) anyone can make a block with this shape, but one is not allowed to call it Accropode, because the name is still a protected trademark. And the contractor will not have technical support from the (former) patent holder. In 2018 a shoreline protection near Colombo, Sri Lanka has been made by the Chinese contractor China Harbour Engineering Company. The contractor has applied the Chinapod, looking identical to the Accropode I, but without guarantee and support of CLI (the former patent holder).

== Design ==
=== Hydraulic stability ===
Specified stability coefficients at design stage:

- Hudson’s design K_{D} values:
  - 15 on trunk sections (16 for Accropode II)
  - 11.5 on roundheads (12.3 for Accropode II)
- Van der Meer stability number :

N_{S} = H_{S}/(∆ D_{n50})= 2.7 (2.8 for Accropode II)

where:

H_{S} = significant wave height

∆ = relative mass density

D_{n50} = nominal diameter

These coefficients are valid for armour slopes from 3H/2V to 4H/3V and for seabed slopes up to 3%.

The uneven surface of the Ecopode improves interlocking by friction, thereby increasing hydraulic stability.

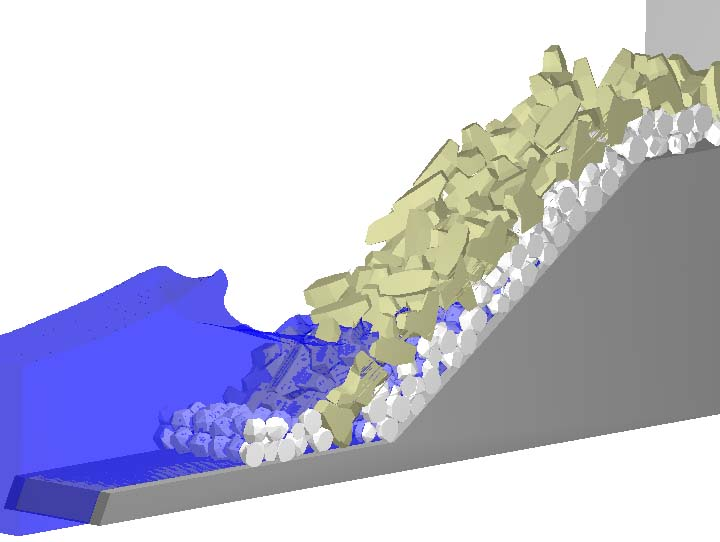
3D simulation of wave motion near an accropodes.

== Implementation ==
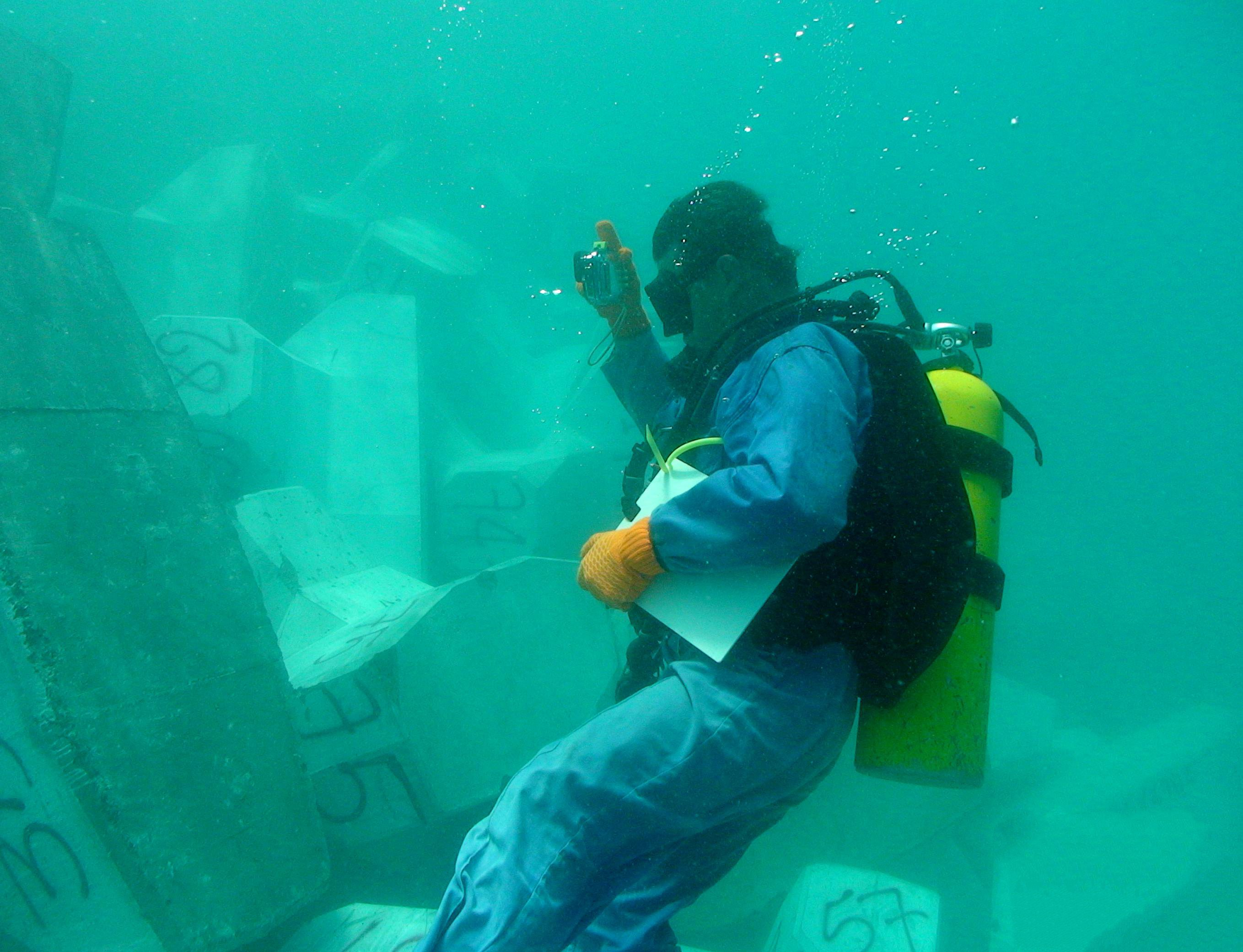
Diver inspecting blocks

Fork-lifting is effective for handling the small to medium size units, whereas large units are handled by sling. Placement for breakwaters generally requires a crane or a barge-mounted crane.

The units can be stored one on top of the other, and placed in a random attitude to obtain the specified packing density. The proper packing method provides an adequate coverage on breakwater slopes.

The use of a remote-release hook is used for placing the unit, while underwater placements may be enhanced by GPS, adhering to a theoretical grid.

== Gallery ==
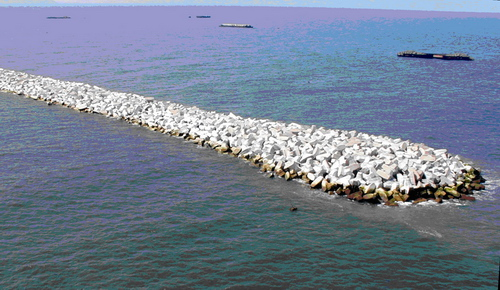
Accropode blocks on offshore breakwater roundhead.

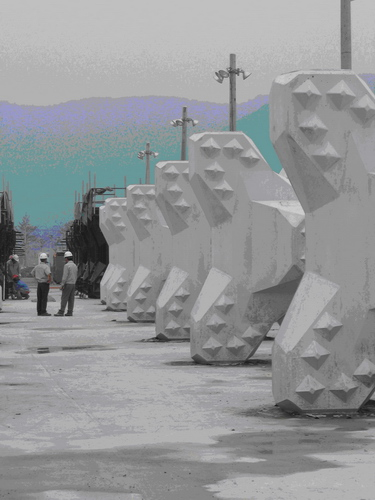
Storage of Accropode II blocks.

Accropode II on forklift.

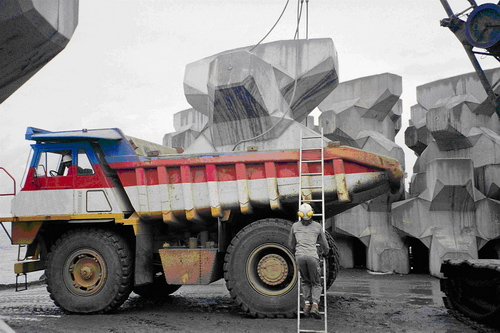
Accropode on truck.

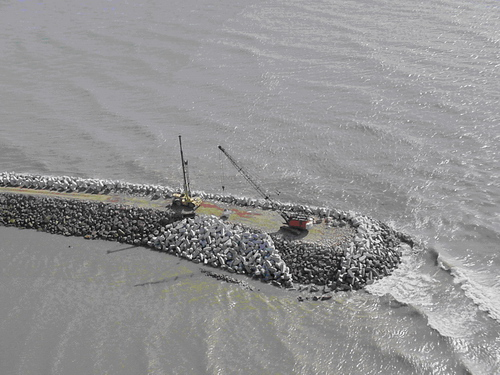
Placing Accropode blocks from land.

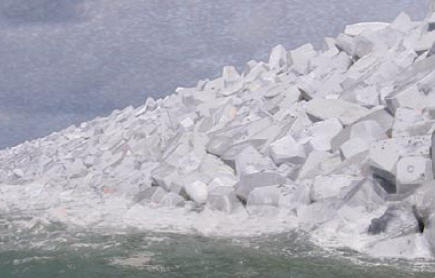
Accropode blocks on breakwater.

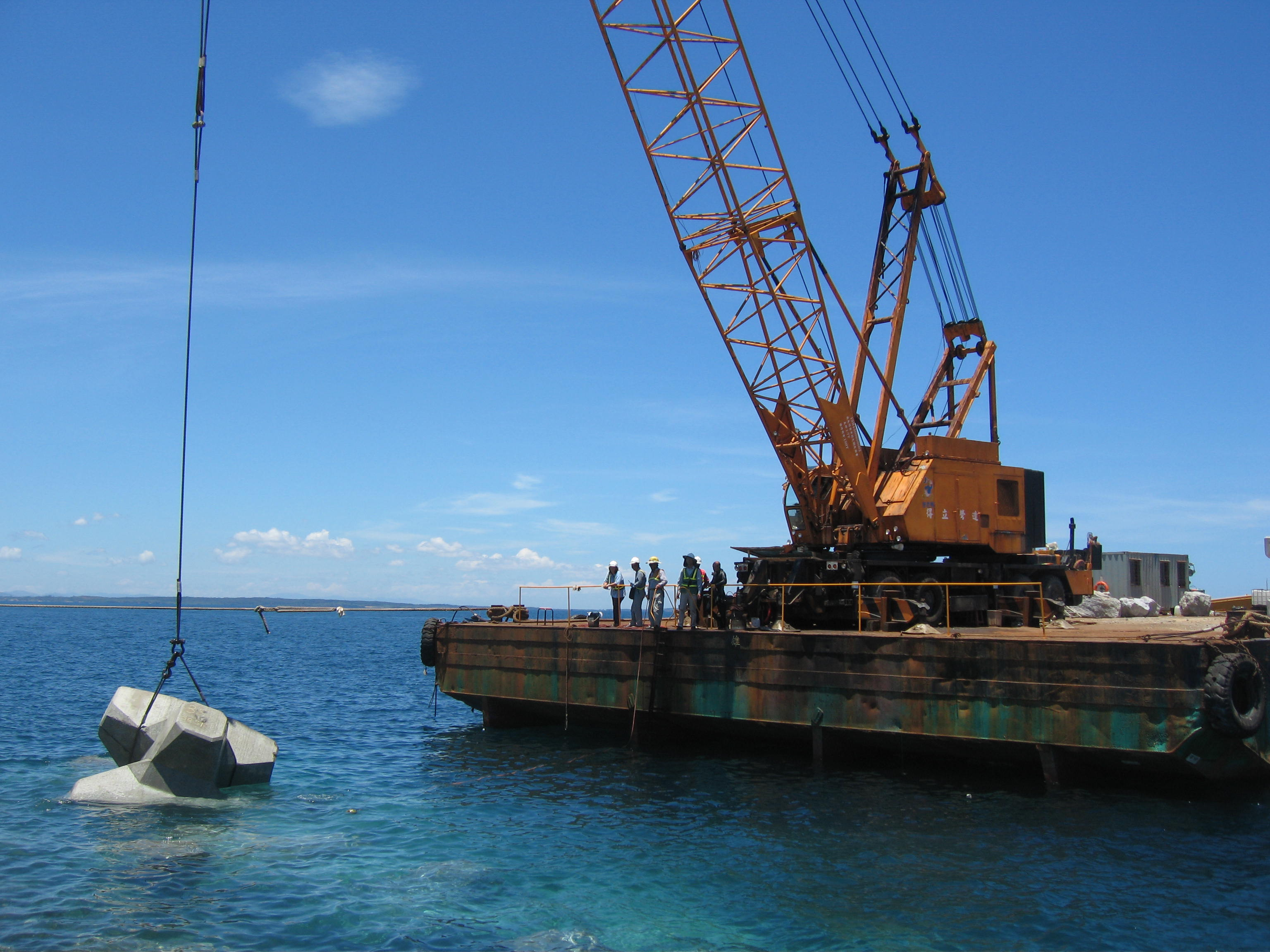
Placing with a crane

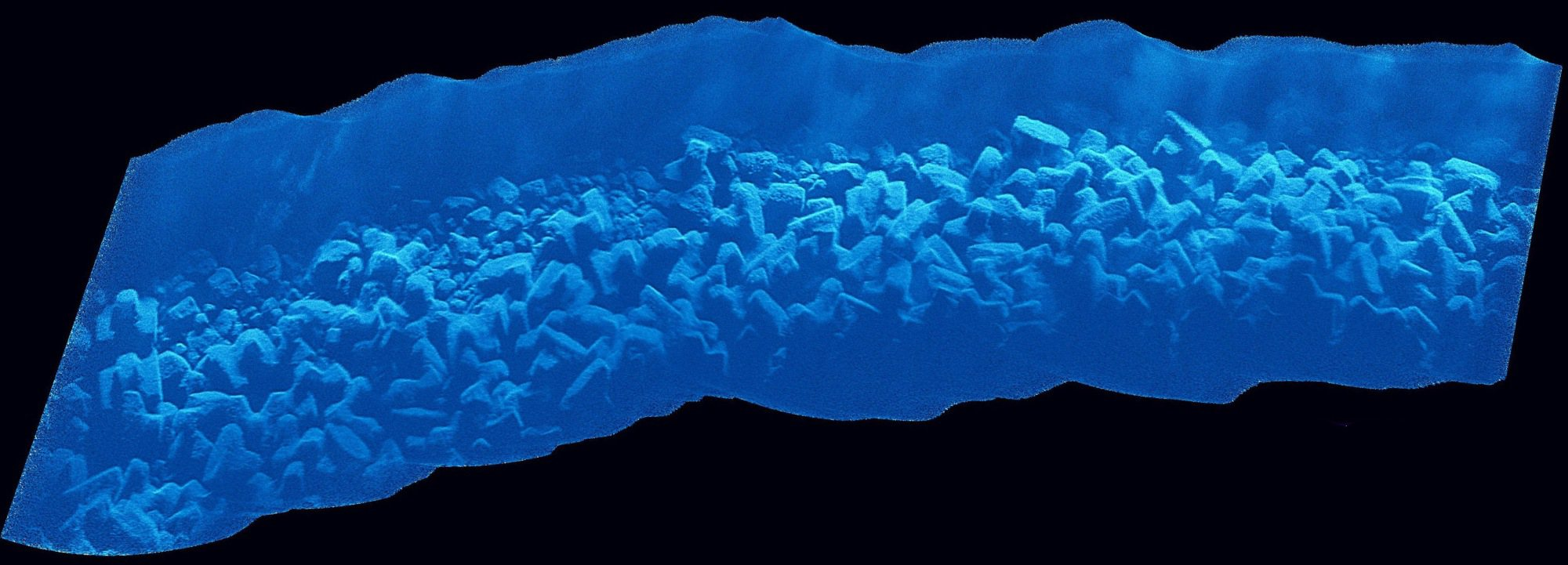
Monitoring

== See also ==
- Breakwater (structure)
- Erosion control
- Riprap
- Artificial reef
- Coastal erosion
- Ocean surface wave
- Seawall
- KOLOS
- Xbloc

== General references to Accropode design ==
- Ciria-CUR (2007) - Rock Manual - The use of rock in hydraulic engineering.
- K. d'Angremond (2004) - Breakwaters and closure dams.
- N.W.H. Allsop (2002) - Breakwaters, coastal structures and coastlines.
- J.W. Van der Meer (1988) - Rock slopes and gravel beaches under wave attack.
- Delft Hydraulics Laboratory (1987) - Stability of rubble mound breakwaters - Stability formula for breakwaters armoured with Accropode (report H 546).
- U.S. Army Corps of Engineer Waterways Experiment Station (WES) - Shore Protection Manual (1984) - Hudson formula based on Hudson's extensive work in the fifties.
