= Xbloc =

Concrete breakwater element

An Xbloc is a wave-dissipating concrete block (or "armour unit") designed to protect shores, harbour walls, seawalls, breakwaters and other coastal structures from the direct impact of incoming waves. The Xbloc model was designed and developed in 2001 by the Dutch firm Delta Marine Consultants, now called BAM Infraconsult, a subsidiary of the Royal BAM Group. Xbloc has been subjected to extensive research by several universities.

== Benefits vs other systems ==
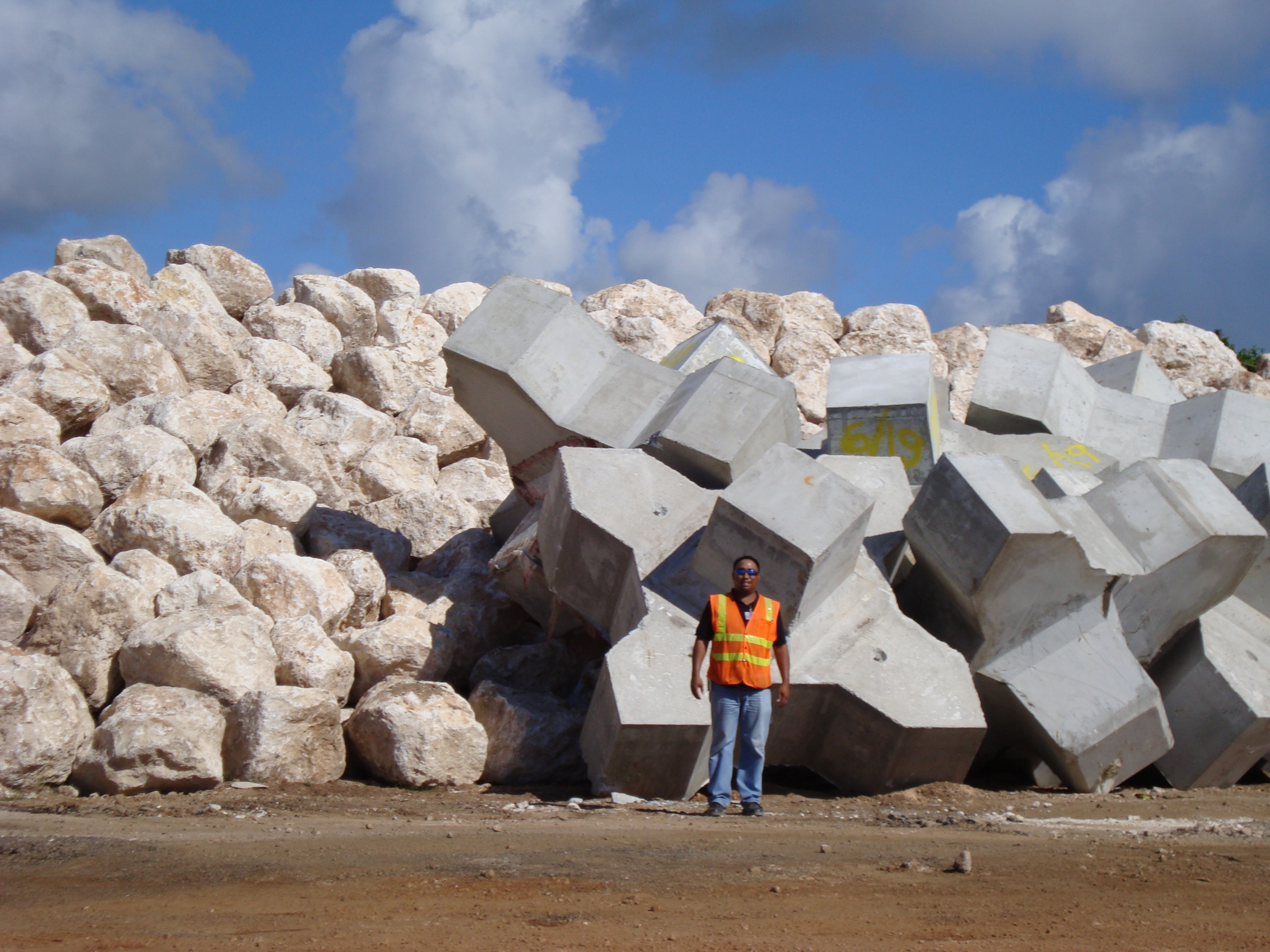
Large Xblocs (8.0 m^{3} or 280 cu ft) on a trial placement area

Concrete armour units are generally applied in breakwaters and shore protections. The units are placed in a single layer as the outer layer of the coastal structure. This layer is called the armour layer. Its function is twofold: (1) to protect the finer material below it against severe wave action; (2) to dissipate the wave energy to reduce the wave run-up, overtopping and reflection. These functions require a heavy, but porous armour.

Common factors to apply single layer concrete armour units are:

- natural rock is unavailable in required size or quality to withstand design wave or current loads
- quarry production is insufficient to match the material demand
- existing quarries are in uneconomic distance to project location
- road connections have load restrictions (bridges) and other bottlenecks, are in poor condition or congested

Whereas older concrete armour units such as tetrapods are typically placed in a double-layer arrangement, modern single-layer armour units (like the Xbloc and Accropode) require significantly less concrete, reducing cost and carbon footprint.

The patent for the Xbloc expired in 2023.

== Hydraulic stability and interlocking mechanism ==
The Xbloc armour unit derives its hydraulic stability from its self-weight and by interlocking with surrounding units. Due to the highly porous armour layer (layer porosity of almost 60%) constructed with Xbloc units, the energy of the incoming waves is largely absorbed. The Xbloc armour layer is therefore able to protect the rock in the under layer from erosion due to waves. In addition to empirical formulae derived from physical model testing, the interaction between breakwater elements (submerged or emerged) and waves as well as the filtration of the fluid into the porous breakwater has been investigated amongst others by MEDUS, based on RANS equations coupled with a RNG turbulence model.

Xblocs are typically applied on an armour slope steepness between 3V:4H and 2V:3H. Unlike natural rock, the hydraulic stability does not increase at shallower slope inclinations, because, in that situation, the interlocking effect is reduced. Standard Xbloc sizes vary between 0.75m^{3} (significant wave height up to H_{s} = 3.35m) and 20m^{3} (H_{s} = 10.0m). It is noted that the given relation between design wave height and volume size is valid for the concept stage only. Further parameters as foreshore slope, crest configuration, construction equipment, etc. can have an important effect on the recommended unit size. For detailed design, in particular for non standard situations, physical model tests are essential and normally carried out to confirm overall stability and functional performance of a breakwater (wave overtopping and/ or wave penetration).

The effect of interlocking is apparent when comparing a rock revetment with a modern single layer unit for average boundary conditions, while taking into account the lower specific density of concrete compared to most natural rock commonly used in breakwater construction. Assuming that natural rock would be placed at identical slope steepness, the individual rock weight would require to be three times as high, compared to Xbloc units. Rock is generally to be placed as double layer, thus the volume of armour material which needs to be quarried, stored, handled, transported and installed can be enormous for a larger breakwater exposed to significant wave action. Due to the interlocking effect the weight, and thus the volume, of single layer armour units is considerably less compared to an armour consisting entirely of rock. In addition, units are normally fabricated near or at project site, so that transport issues are less critical.

== Production of armour units ==
The Xbloc consists of non-reinforced concrete, similar to other single layer armour units. Ordinary concrete C25/30 is normally appropriate for the production of Xbloc armour units. However, often concrete of higher strength is applied for other reasons, e.g. early strength for faster de-moulding, ice loads, etc. By omitting reinforcement, time and costs are cut and the armour units are less vulnerable to long term corrosion damage. The optimal shape of a single layer armour unit combines the robustness of a compact concrete body with the slenderness required for interlocking. The structural integrity is normally confirmed by finite element calculations (FEM) and prototype drop tests.

Although both wooden and steel moulds can be used to construct the Xbloc formwork, steel moulds are preferred as they can be used repeatedly to produce large numbers of armour units. Various mould designs, consisting of 2 sections, are used. The moulds are either vertically or horizontally assembled. Pouring and compaction of concrete is done simultaneously. An appropriate formwork design is facilitating the stripping of the moulds at an early stage and largely prevents honey combing, surface bubbles and striking damage.

Due to the shape of the Xbloc unit, relatively simple formwork can be used which is made of a limited number of different steel plates. Since a single Xbloc unit can weigh up to 45 tons, the construction is done as close as possible to the area of application.

== Placement ==
In contrast to the placement of other interlocking concrete blocks, the Xbloc unit does not require stringent specifications about the orientation of each unit on a breakwater slope. Because of the shape of the Xbloc, each of the 6 sides of the unit is efficiently interlocking. Hence, the blocks easily find a position that fully utilizes the interlocking mechanism. This increases the efficiency of placing armour units on a slope. Due to the random structure and high porosity of an Xbloc breakwater, an artificial reef habitat is created for marine fauna and flora.

== XblocPlus ==
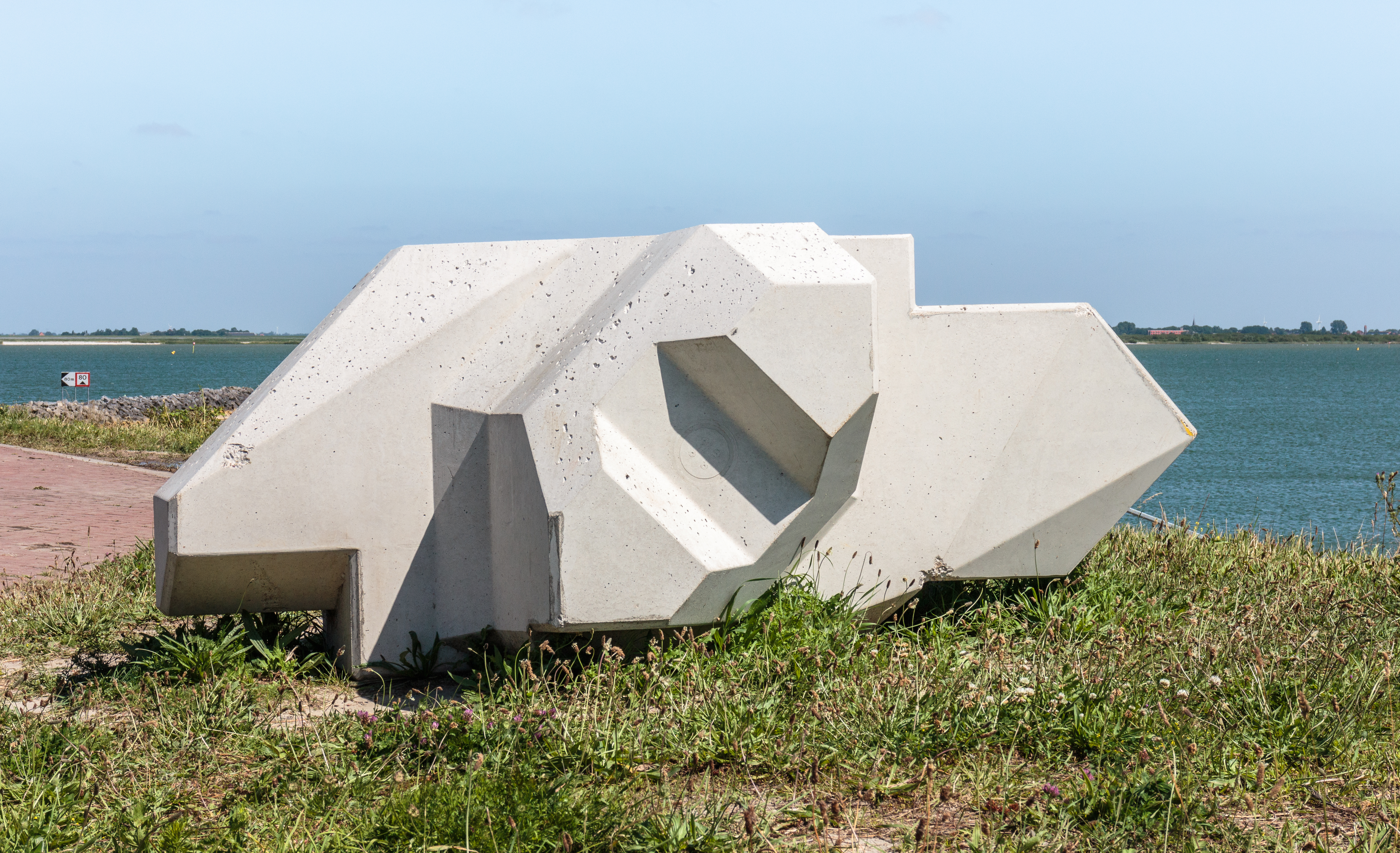
XblocPlus

DMC came to the market in 2018 with the XblocPlus. Rather than simply being an improved version of the Xbloc, XblocPlus is differently functioning block with its own advantages and disadvantages. The XblocPlus needs to be placed regularly and has characteristics found in placed blocks such as natural basaltic columns or concrete-placed blocks. DMC saw opportunities for this block in the Afsluitdijk improvement that began in 2018. Here this block is used in the wave impact zone. The block in this usage is called the ‘Levvel-block’, after the joint-venture that improves the Afsluitdijk. The Basalton Quattroblok is placed in the wave run-up zone on the Afsluitdijk. The XblocPlus is also used in the Vistula Spit canal in Poland.

== See also ==
- Coastal management – Preventing flooding and erosion of shorelines
- Coastal erosion – Displacement of land along the coastline
- Ocean surface wave – Surface waves generated by wind on open water
- KOLOS – Concrete breakwater element
- Dolos – Concrete breakwater element
- Tetrapod – Concrete breakwater element
- Accropode – Concrete breakwater element
