= Riprap =

Rock or concrete protective armour

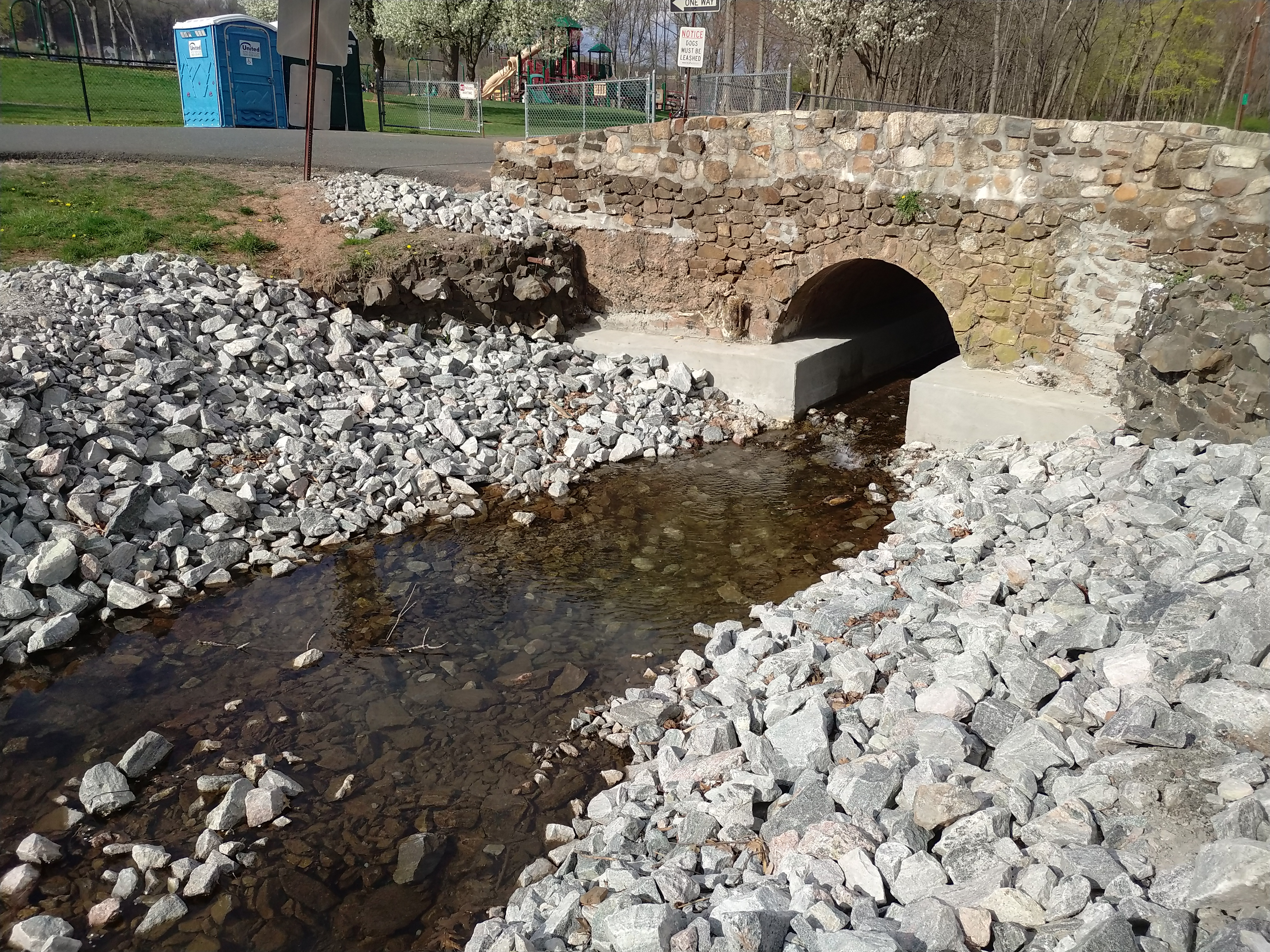
Riprap used to protect a streambank from erosion

Riprap (in North American English), also known as rip rap, rip-rap, shot rock, rock armour (in British English) or rubble, is human-placed rock or other hard, heavy, unconsolidated material used to protect shoreline structures against scour and water, wave, or ice erosion. Riprap is used to armor shorelines, streambeds, bridge abutments, foundational infrastructure supports and other shoreline structures against erosion. Common rock types used include granite and modular concrete blocks. Rubble from building and paving demolition is sometimes used, as well as specifically designed structures called tetrapods or similar concrete blocks. Riprap is also used underwater to cap immersed tubes sunken on the seabed to be joined into an undersea tunnel.

== Design and installation ==
Riprap design takes into account the size and gradation of the rock, the thickness of the protective layer, water flow and wave conditions, the slope being protected and the characteristics of the underlaying soil. Rock size is commonly described using D50, which represents the median particle size in a graded riprap mixtures.

Riprap generally consists of a range of stone sizes rather than uniformly sized rocks. The stones are placed to form a stable protective layer while still allowing the water to move through the spaces between them. Where necessary, a granular filter layer or geotextile is installed beneath the riprap to reduce the loss of soil particles and help prevent the layer from being undermined.

The amount of riprap required for a project depends on surface area being protected and the specified thickness of the rock layer. These dimensions can be used to estimate the volume of material required, while the approximate weight depends on the bulk density of the selected rock.

== Environmental effects ==
=== Sediment effects ===
Riprap causes morphological changes in the riverbeds they surround. One such change is the reduction of sediment settlement in the river channel, which can lead to scouring of the river bed as well as coarser sediment particles. This can be combatted by increasing the distance between the pieces of riprap and using a variety of sizes.

The usage of riprap may not even stop erosion, but simply move it downstream. Additionally, the soil beneath the riprap can be eroded if the rock was just placed on top without any buffer between the layers such as a geotextile fabric or smaller riprap (crushed stone).

=== Changes in organic material and the ecosystem ===
Riprap affects the amount of organic material in a waterbody by acting as a filter, catching wood and leaves before they can enter the water. Riprap also covers and prevents plants from growing through, which can reduce shade over the water.

Introducing ripraps creates a rocky environment that can affect a waterbody's ecology by making the ecosystem more heterogeneous. While it can negatively affect some organisms by removing shoreline vegetation, the rock can provide important refuge for invertebrates and small fish. By preventing woody plants from growing and shading the water, riprap can also increase the amount of algae and hydrophytes.

== Gallery ==
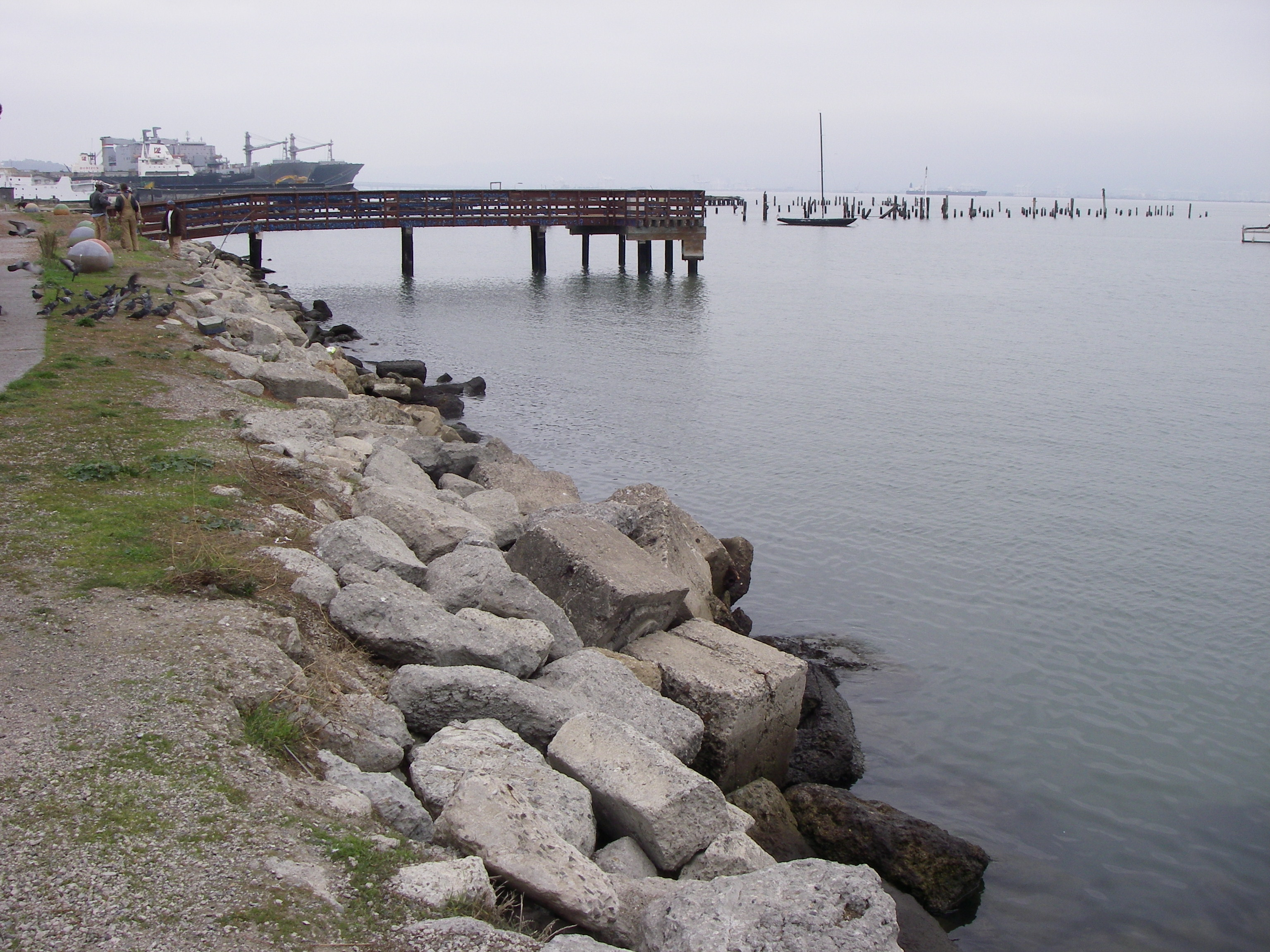
Concrete rubble used as riprap along the San Francisco Bay shoreline

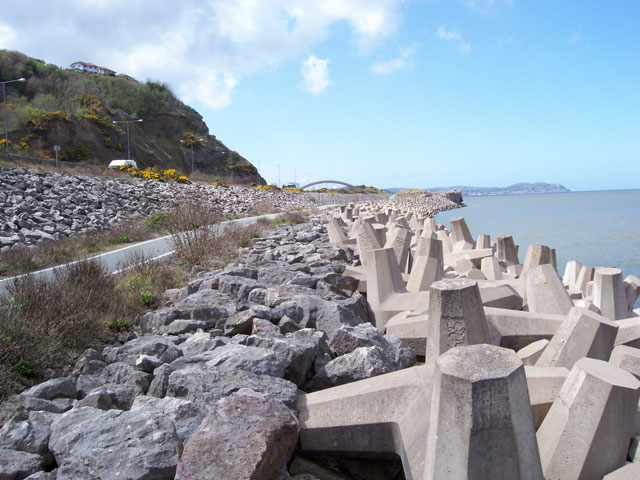
Modular concrete block riprap, in the form of Dolos

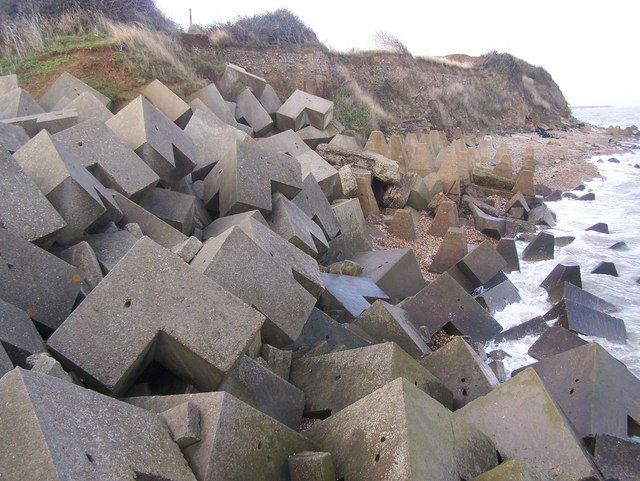
Modular concrete block riprap

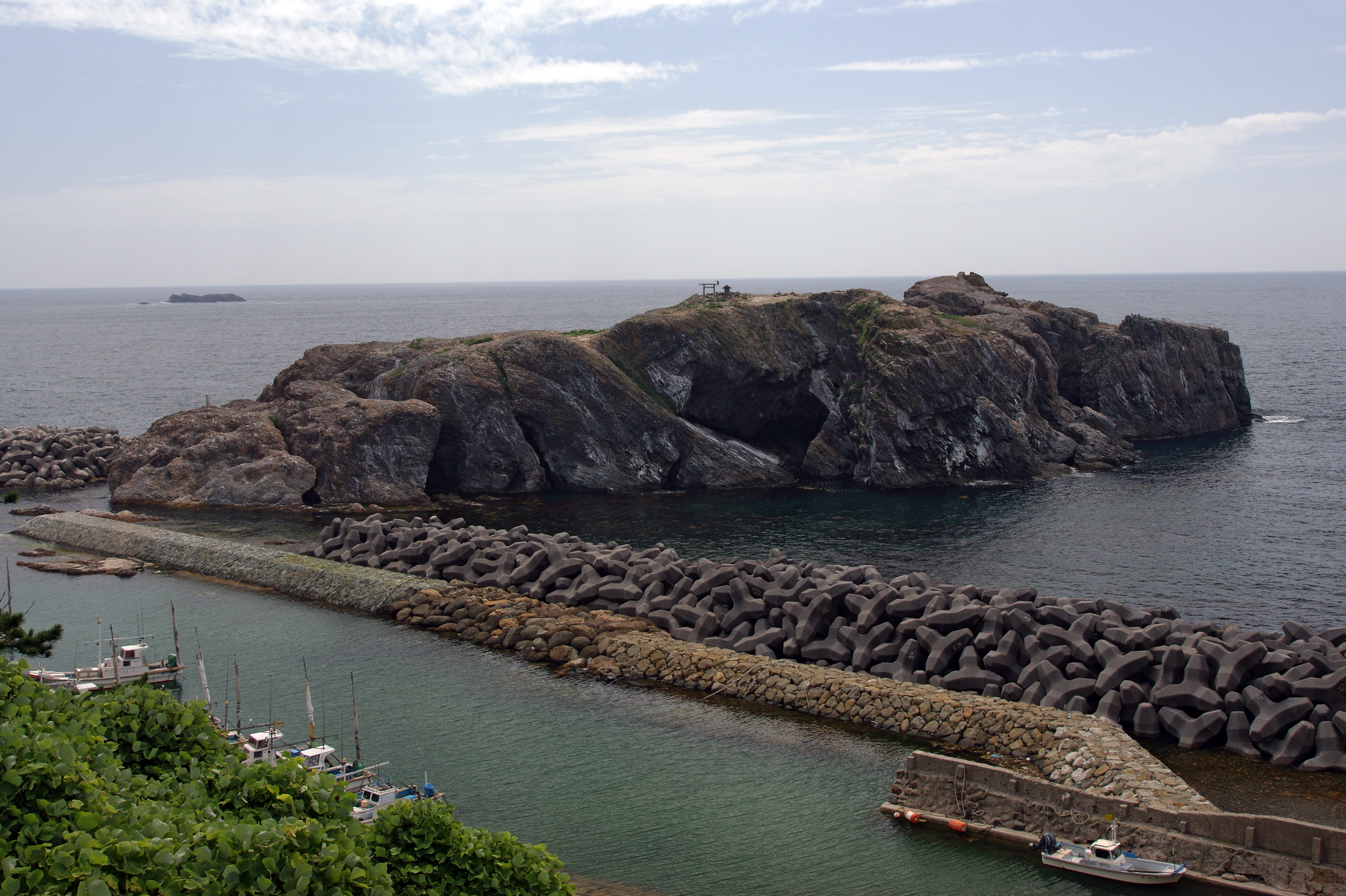
Modular concrete block riprap

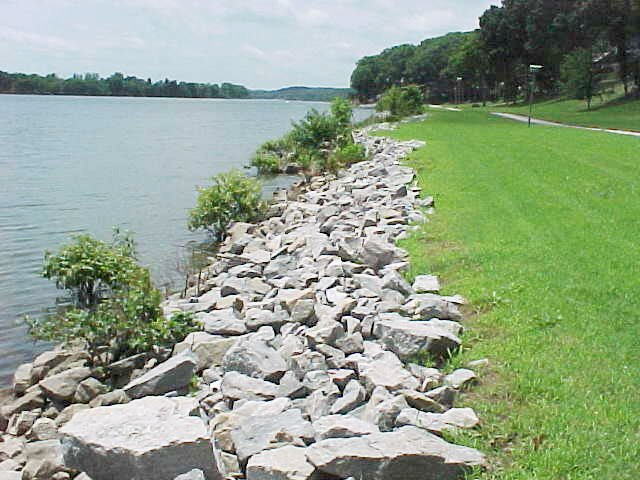
Riprap lining a lake shore

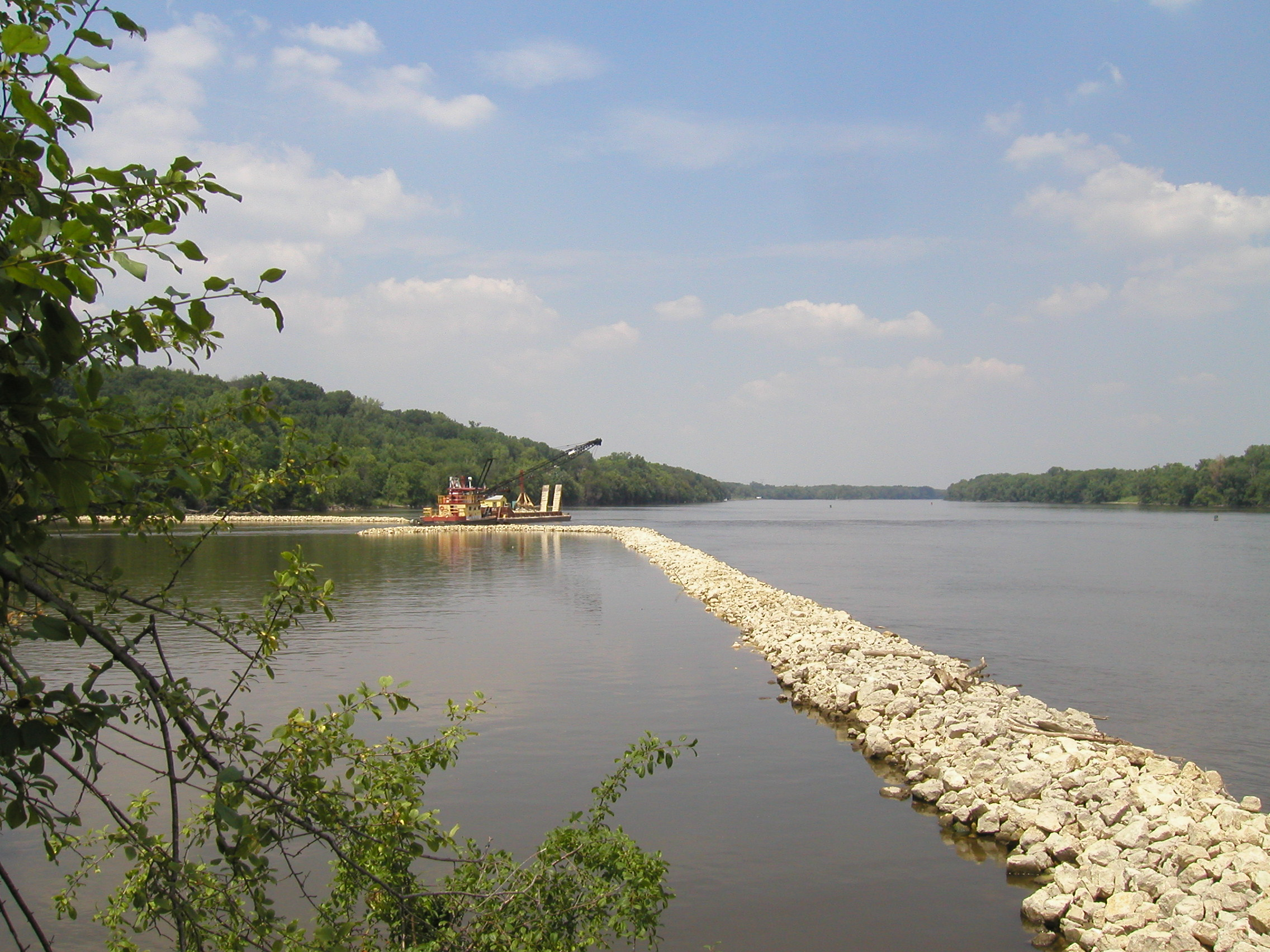
Riprap closing off a channel on the Mississippi River

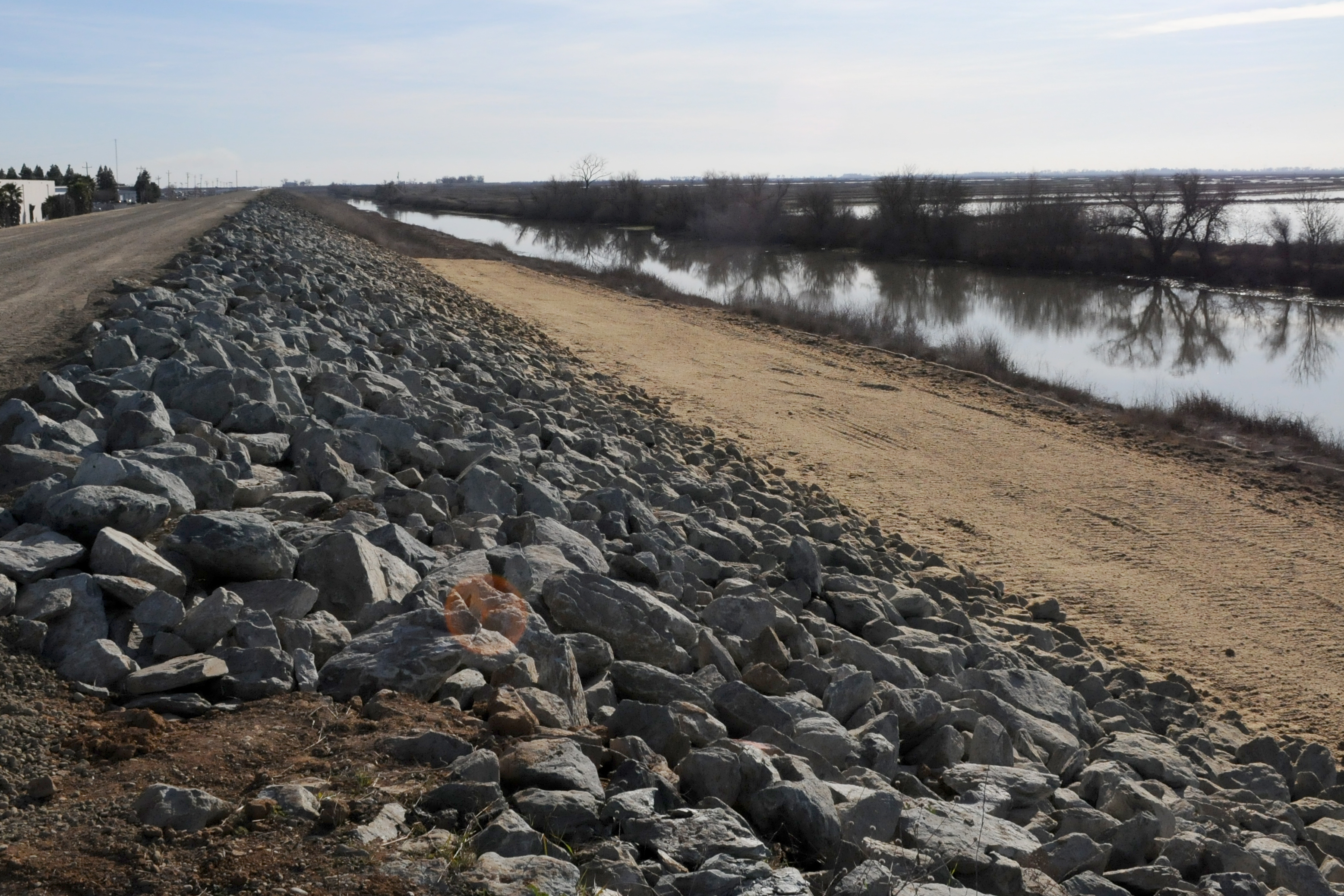
Riprap protecting a levee

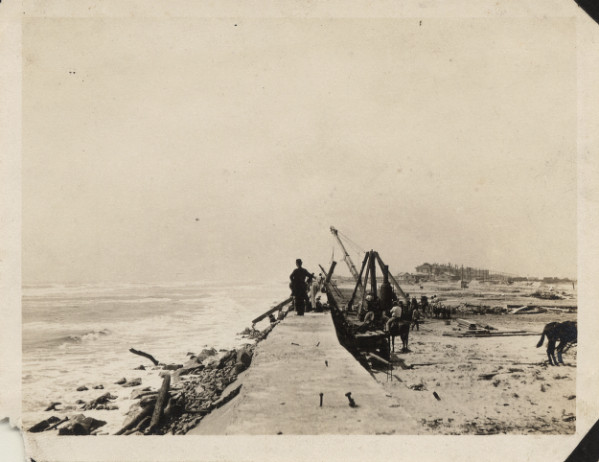
Crews replacing riprap at Galveston Seawall after a 1915 hurricane

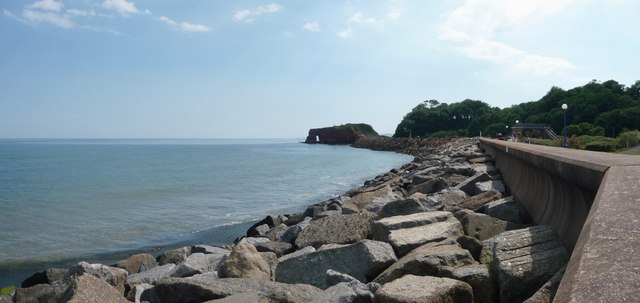
Riprap protecting a concrete retaining wall

== See also ==
- Dolos
- Gabion
- Tetrapod

== Other sources ==
- Ciria-CUR (2007) - Rock Manual - The use of rock in hydraulic engineering.
- N.W.H. Allsop (2002) - Breakwaters, coastal structures and coastlines.
- US Dept. of Transportation (2004) - Trail Construction and Maintenance Notebook
