= Coastal engineering =

Branch of civil engineering

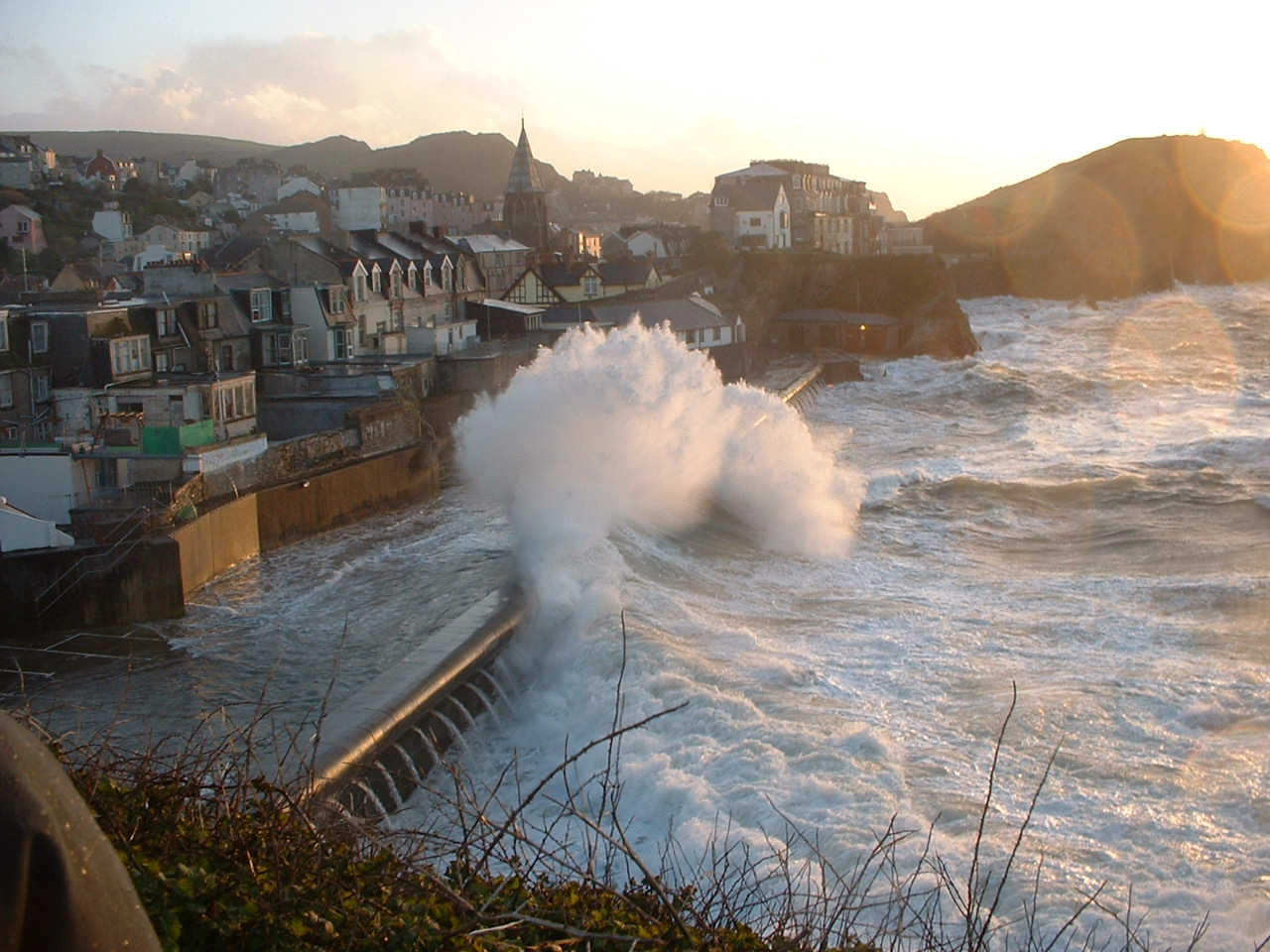
Wave attack on Ilfracombe's sea walls during a storm.

Coastal engineering is a branch of civil engineering concerned with the specific demands posed by constructing at or near the coast, as well as the development of the coast itself.

The hydrodynamic impact of especially waves, tides, storm surges and tsunamis and (often) the harsh environment of salt seawater are typical challenges for the coastal engineer – as are the morphodynamic changes of the coastal topography, caused both by the autonomous development of the system and human-made changes. The areas of interest in coastal engineering include the coasts of the oceans, seas, marginal seas, estuaries and big lakes.

Besides the design, building and maintenance of coastal structures, coastal engineers are often interdisciplinarily involved in integrated coastal zone management, also because of their specific knowledge of the hydro- and morphodynamics of the coastal system. This may include providing input and technology for e.g. environmental impact assessment, port development, strategies for coastal defense, land reclamation, offshore wind farms and other energy-production facilities, etc.

History

The History of coastal engineering can be dated back to the Early first century with the development of ancient ports in Rome such as the ports of Ostia and Portus. Evidence from carbon dating in archeological digs exhibit common properties of human efforts to form or change the two sites for the harbors. This was done by analyzing the radiocarbon content found in the different sediments. The group was able to analyze the sediment to approximate the different dredging phases that had been done. Particularly it seemed evident that there was planning for the quays and canals that were present in these two ports as well as many different dredging efforts in different phases.

While the specific date can not be pinpointed, such structures that reflect modern breakwaters and harbor infrastructure were discovered in Greece by Pausinias, an ancient Greek geographer, in 122 AD in the town of Aegina along the Saronic Gulf. These structures were used as protection as well as controlled passages as entry into the ancient port. The new port in Aegina has been built on top of the old infrastructure laid out from the ancient Greeks.

== Specific challenges ==
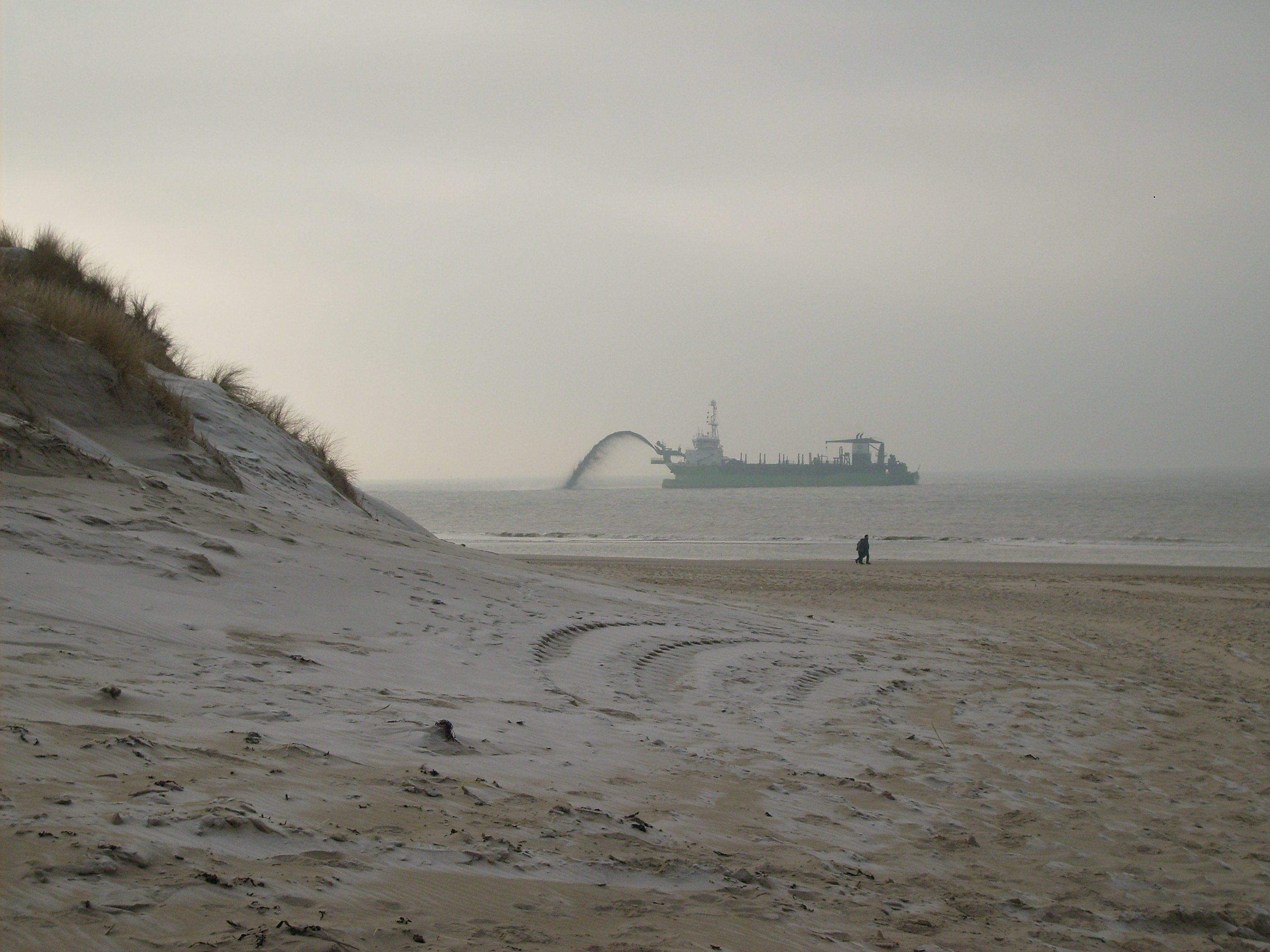
Beach nourishment at the Dutch coast.

The coastal environment produces challenges specific for this branch of engineering: waves, storm surges, tides, tsunamis, sea level changes, sea water and the marine ecosystem.

Most often, in coastal engineering projects there is a need for metocean conditions: local wind and wave climate, as well as statistics for and information on other hydrodynamic quantities of interest. Also, bathymetry and morphological changes are of direct interest. In case of studies of sediment transport and morphological changes, relevant properties of the sea bed sediments, water and ecosystem properties are needed.

=== Long and short waves ===
Classification of the spectrum of ocean waves according to wave period, by Walter Munk (1950).

The occurrence of wave phenomena – like sea waves, swell, tides and tsunamis – require engineering knowledge of their physics, as well as models: both numerical models and physical models. The practices in present-day coastal engineering are more-and-more based on models verified and validated by experimental data.

Apart from the wave transformations themselves, for the waves coming from deep water into the shallow coastal waters and surf zone, the effects of the waves are important. These effects include:

- the wave loading on coastal structures like breakwaters, groynes, jetties, sea walls and dikes
- wave-induced currents, like the longshore current in the surf zone, rip currents and Stokes drift, affecting sediment transport and morphodynamics
- wave agitation in harbors, which may result in harbor downtime
- wave overtopping over seawalls and dikes, which may e.g. threaten the stability of a dike

=== Underwater construction ===
Coastal engineering takes place at or near the interface between land and water. Consequently a significant part of coastal engineering involves underwater construction, particularly for foundations. Breakwaters, sea walls, harbour structures like jetties, wharves and docks, bridges, tunnels, outfalls and causeways usually involve underwater work.

=== Sustainability and soft engineering ===
In recent decades, coastal engineers have favored non-structural solutions, which avoid adverse impacts that are typically cause by structures, such as sea walls, bulkheads, jetties, etc. These solutions include beach nourishment, marsh restoration/creation, and habitat restoration. More recently, beneficial use of dredge material, which utilizes material dredged for navigation maintenance to nourish beaches and restore wetlands. Beneficial use is also employed to increase the elevation of marsh platforms in an attempt to adapt to sea level rise.

Regional sediment management has also become a focus strategy for coastal practitioners. This essentially uses nearshore sediment sources and knowledge of coastal morphology to identify which accretional features can be harvested to bolster erosional areas, understanding the harvested material will continue to accumulate. A common regional sediment management option is to dredge ebb and flood shoals to nourish beaches.

Both beneficial use and regional sediment management recognizes the scarcity of material resources offshore and upland.Climate Change

Climate Change

Another relevant aspect that coastal engineers need to plan for is the effect of climate change whether that be from water levels rising or temperature changes in the water. Climate change provokes many unknowns for engineers to navigate. Scientists (Karvetski, Lambert, Keisler, and Linkov) recognized and developed a methodology that coastal engineers can use to identify different scenarios and how to approach climate change problems through an economical, engineering, and ethical way. This methodology considers the problem at hand such as sea-level rising or influx of storm frequency and analyzes a solution that considers the different stakeholders. This decision analysis finds many strategies for coastal engineers to make informed decisions on what infrastructure to implement.

Another group formulated a strategy that combines nature conservation and coastal management. This strategy consisted of examples of creating marshes that disperse wave energy, while also providing ecosystems for coastal wildlife. Another concept this group discussed was that coral reefs are natural breakwaters that are slowly being destroyed due to ocean acidification from climate change. Natural and artificial reefs can be used to lower wave height on an average of 70% reducing the wave energy dispersed onshore.

Dredging

Dredging refers to the mechanical or hydraulic removal of sediments such as sand, silt, or mud from the floors of oceans, rivers or estuaries in order to maintain boat channels, mitigate surpluses of sediment, to reclaim submerged areas and shoreline preservation. A common use of dredging is to purposely alter bathymetry which affects sediment transport, wave-current interaction and morphological recovery. Two different types of dredging are topping, which is to remove sediment from the crest of a sand wave to lower its amplitude, and trough dredging, which removes sediment from the trough between the waves. Both of these methods change the morphology of the ocean post the dredging process. Two other strategies are uniform removal which is extracting sediment evenly over the terrain or selective removal which targets specific areas of high relief such as navigational channels while also mitigating against unwanted morphological consequences.

== New Technology ==
Satellites

New Satellite optical imagery has become an essential tool for coastal engineering. This has enabled large-scale observation and analysis of shoreline changes, the transportation of sediment and coastal morphology. Advances in programs like Google Earth have made it possible for coastal engineers to analyze shorelines and bathymetry from public satellite imagery. In the future, it is expected that high-resolution imaging and videos from space are going to enhance coastal mapping and data essential for management and modeling.

OpenFoam

OpenFOAM is an open-source computational fluid dynamics (CFD) program which allows the simulation of two-phase water/air flows. A study done by scientists (Pablo Higuera, Javier L. Lara, Inigo J. Losada) analyzed how the program was used to formulate flow through porous breakwater and wave-like interactions. The program was able to accurately simulate free-surface elevation, different pressure systems, and wave dissipation that was consistent with experimental data. This program allows for coastal engineers to model coastal processes such as wave formation accurately which can be used for designs.

A.I.

AI is a tool that coastal engineers have started to implement in their practices, especially when it comes to modeling. Programs such as physics-informed machine learning (PIML) are being integrated to address the different challenges that climate change, sea level rising, and extreme weather pose. These systems categorize AI applications across different subdomains such as wave modeling, predicting shoreline change, sediment transport, and structural integrity. The different challenges with using these models is the scarce amount of data available, inability to detect new patterns, and the lack of adaptation for different uncertainties. However it shows promise within the next decade to improve its predictive capacity and support for decision making within coastal engineering.

== See also ==
- Beach erosion and accretion – Area of loose particles at the edge of a body of water
  - Beach evolution – Changes to a shoreline by accretion and erosion
    - Beach evolution#Modern beach recession – Changes to a shoreline by accretion and erosion
  - Beach nourishment – Sediment replacement process
  - Raised beach – Emergent coastal landform
- Integrated coastal zone management – Environmental management system
  - Coastal management – Preventing flooding and erosion of shorelines, to prevent coastal erosion and creation of beach
  - Coastal and oceanic landforms – Feature of the solid surface of a planetary body
  - Coastal development hazards – Type of anthropogenic effect on the environment
  - Coastal erosion – Displacement of land along the coastline
  - Coastal geography – Study of the region between the ocean and the land
  - Coastal engineering
    - Hard engineering – Construction of hydraulic structures to reduce coastal erosion
    - Soft engineering – Shoreline management based on sustainability principles
  - Coastal morphodynamics – Interaction of shoreline seafloor topography and fluid hydrodynamic processes
  - Coastal and Estuarine Research Federation – U.S. nonprofit organization (CERF)
  - Human impacts on coasts – Area where land meets the sea or ocean
  - Sea level rise – Rise in sea levels due to climate change
  - Natural hazard – Conditions that could lead to a natural disaster
- Erosion – Natural processes removing soil and rock
  - Bioerosion – Erosion of hard ocean substrates by living organisms
  - Blowhole – Hole at the top of a sea-cave which allows waves to force water or spray out of the hole
  - Natural arch – Arch-shaped natural rock formation
  - Wave-cut platform – Narrow flat area created by erosion
  - Hydrodynamic scour – Removal of sediment near an obstruction by swiftly moving water
    - Bridge scour – Erosion of sediment near bridge foundations by water
    - Tidal scour – Sea-floor erosion caused by strong tidal currents
  - Seabed gouging by ice – Outcome of the interaction between drifting ice and the seabed
- Longshore drift – Sediment moved by the longshore current
  - Deposition (sediment) – Geological process in which sediments are added to a landform or landmass
  - Coastal sediment supply – Transport of sediment to the beach environment
  - Sand dune stabilization – Coastal management practice
  - Submersion – Aspect of coastal erosion
