= Escape from Alcatraz (triathlon) =

Race in California

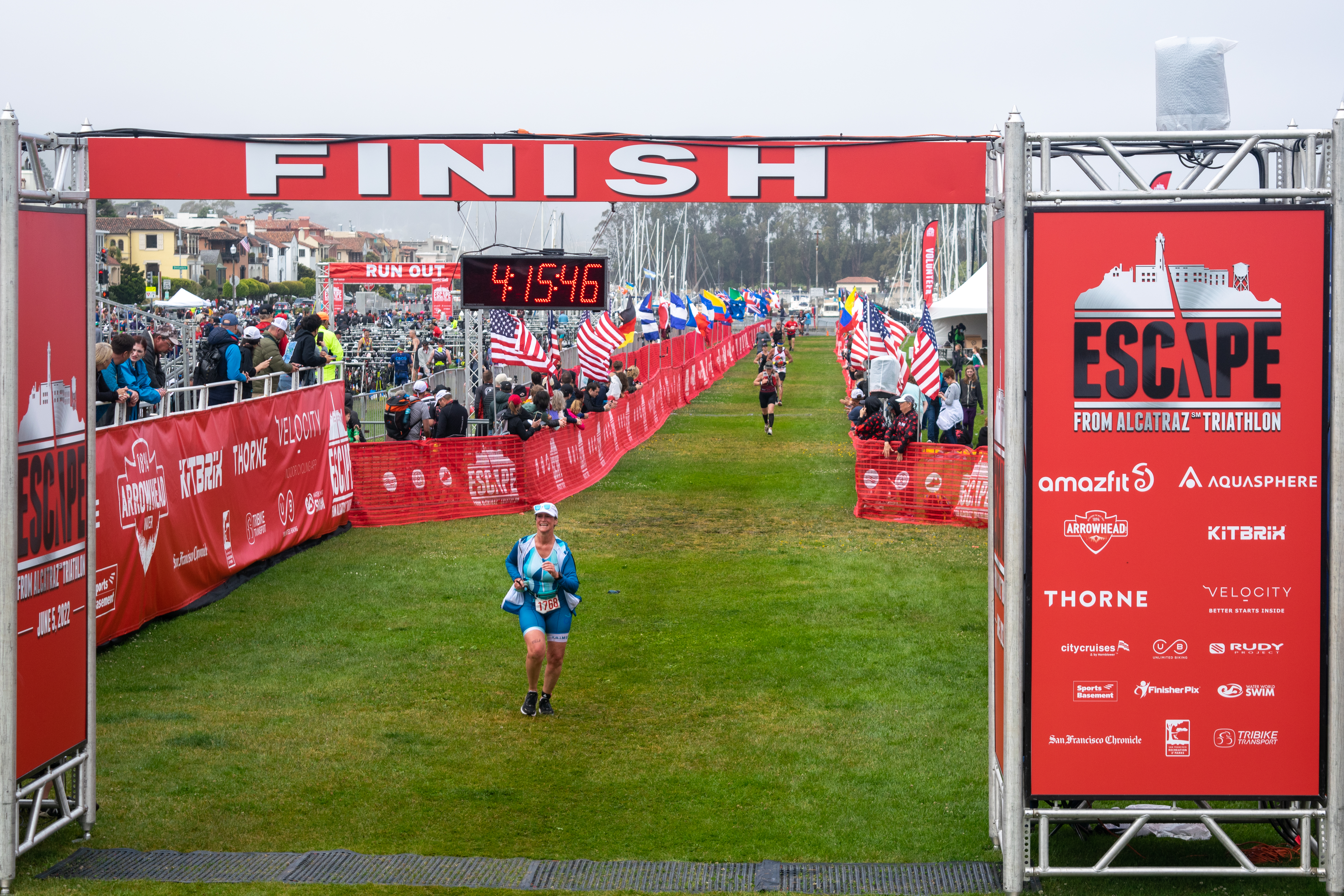
Runners completing the third leg of the 2022 Escape from Alcatraz Triathlon

Escape from Alcatraz is the name for two different triathlons held in the San Francisco Bay Area of California. The Escape from Alcatraz originated in 1981 as a private club event, beginning in San Francisco and ending in Marin County. The race split in 1983 with a separate commercial event open to the public, which is now an aquathlon (having dropped the biking section of a traditional triathlon) held on a shorter course entirely within San Francisco. However, a new public triathlon, also known by the name Escape from Alcatraz, is now run by MARI.

== Original Escape from Alcatraz Triathlon ==
The first Escape from Alcatraz was proposed by Joe Oakes after he participated in the 1979 Ironman Triathlon in Hawaii. The first Escape from Alcatraz race was held two years later in June 1981, with members of the Dolphin Club testing the course. The course started with a swim from Alcatraz Island in the middle of San Francisco Bay to the city of San Francisco, a bike ride over the Golden Gate Bridge to Mill Valley in Marin County, and an out-and-back running course over Mount Tamalpais to Stinson Beach and back. The running course followed the course of the Dipsea foot race, but by making it an out-and-back run rather than a one-way course, became known as a Double Dipsea. The course has remained the same over the years and celebrated its 35th anniversary in 2015. Participants are limited to members of the Dolphin Club and The South End Club. The Dolphin Club is the host and sponsor of the event.

== Escape from Alcatraz Triathlon (IMG) ==
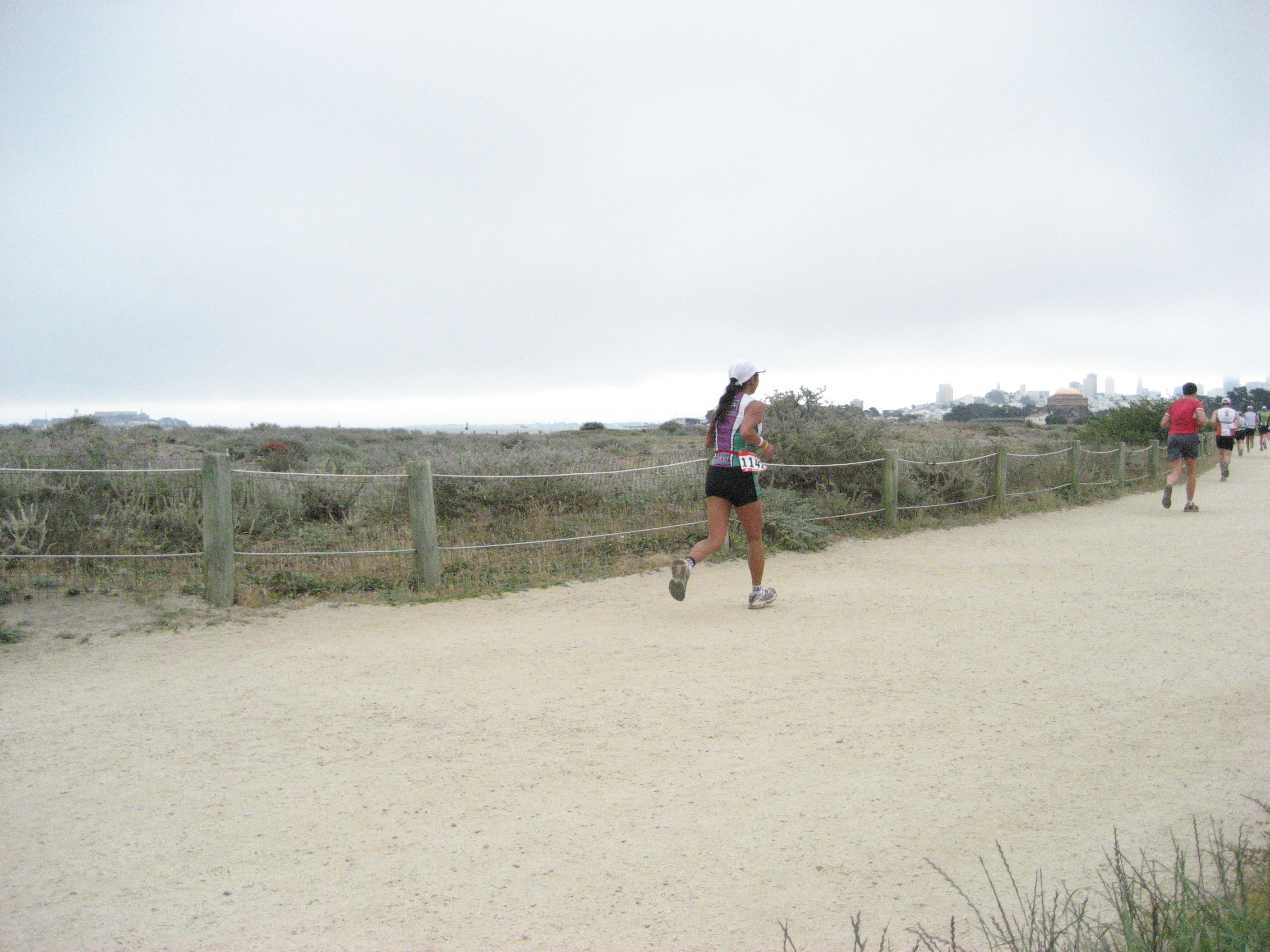
Athletes on a beach section of the running part of the triathlon

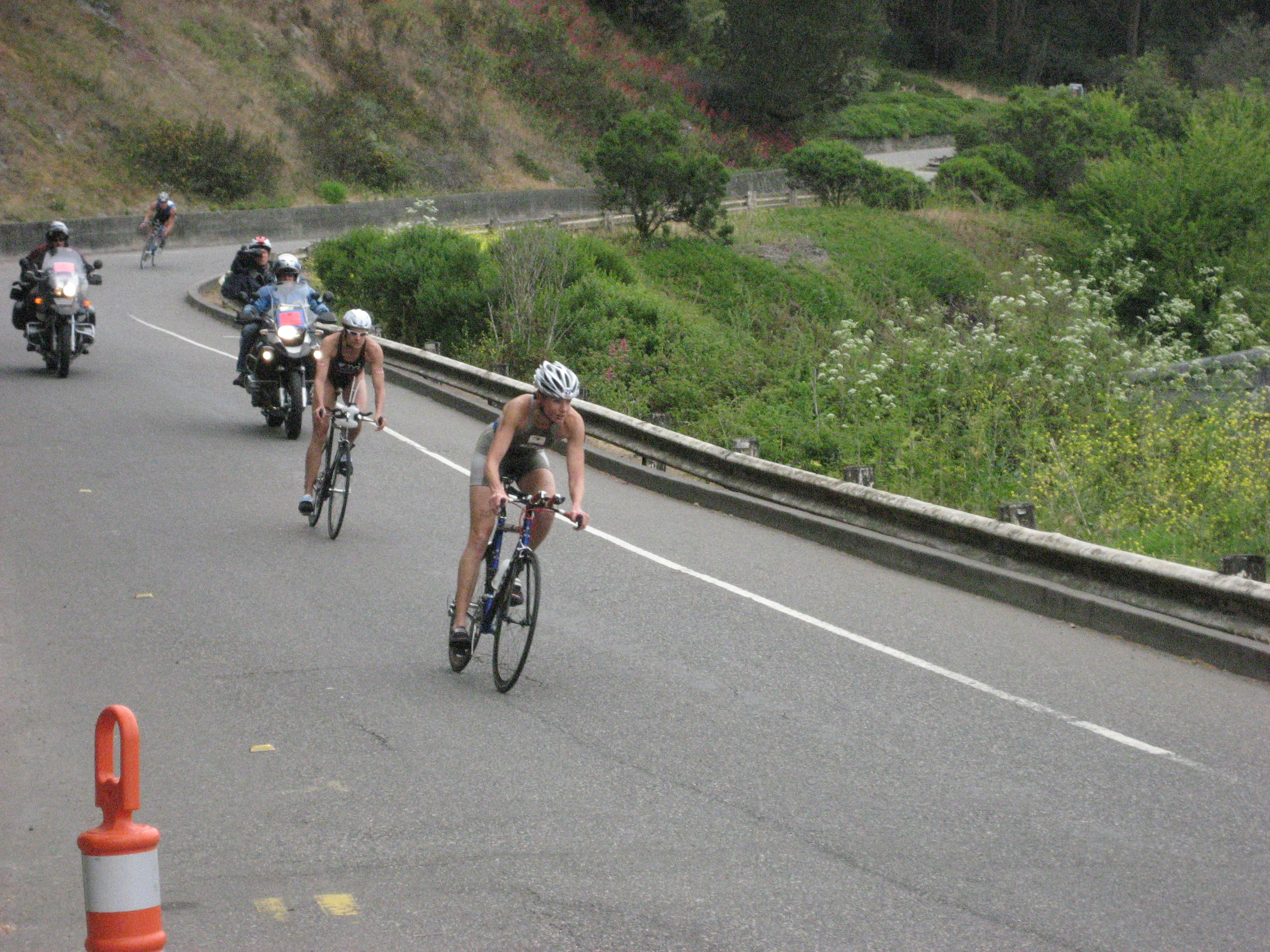
Athletes on the cycling part of the triathlon

The annual public Escape from Alcatraz triathlon, organized by IMG, now takes place in early June. The current course consists of a one-and-a-half-mile (2.4 km) swim starting near Alcatraz Island, a one-half-mile (0.80 km) run from the bay to the transition zone at Marina Green, an eighteen-mile (29 km) bike ride, and an eight-mile (13 km) run. The run portion includes a notorious section called the "sand ladder" at mile five, a climb from Baker Beach back up to the road that is a combination of sand and about 400 uneven log steps. The event had about 1700 participants in 2009. Entry is by Lottery process for most of the slots and the remainder is through qualification, which done through a good rank in the previous Escape from Alcatraz, or in four other triathlon races held during the preceding year.

While entry is via lottery, they give preference to previous entrants.

The one exception to the June timeframe was when the Americas Cup sailing event came to the Bay Area. The resulting shift to March resulted in colder than normal conditions (swim) and more challenging tides than the normal date. The impact of this was a 3 fold increase in swimmers 'rescued' from the water, many more than normal were pulled out and transported to shallow water. They were allowed to continue the event and receive medals for finishing.
