= Air bubble entrainment (hydraulics) =

Entrapment of air bubbles in a turbulent flow

In hydraulic engineering, air bubble entrainment is defined as the entrapment of air bubbles and pockets that are advected within the turbulent flow. The entrainment of air packets can be localised or continuous along the air–water interface. Examples of localised aeration include air entrainment by plunging water jet and at hydraulic jump. Bubbles are entrained locally at the intersection of the impinging jet with the surrounding waters. The intersecting perimeter is a singularity in terms of both air entrainment and momentum exchange, and the air is entrapped at the discontinuity between the impinging jet flow and the receiving pool of water. Interfacial aeration is defined as the air entrainment process along an air–water interface, usually parallel to the flow direction.

In hydraulic structures, free-surface aeration is commonly observed: i.e., the white waters. The air bubble entrainment may be localised or continuous along an interface (water jets, spillway chutes). Despite recent advances, there are some basic concerns about the extrapolation of laboratory results to large size prototype structures.
