= Coastal defence =

Coastal defence (Commonwealth) or Coastal defense (US) may refer to:

- Coastal management, the protection of the coast from the action of wind, wave and tide
- Coastal defence and fortification, the protection of the coast against military or naval attack
