= Coastal management =

Preventing flooding and erosion of shorelines

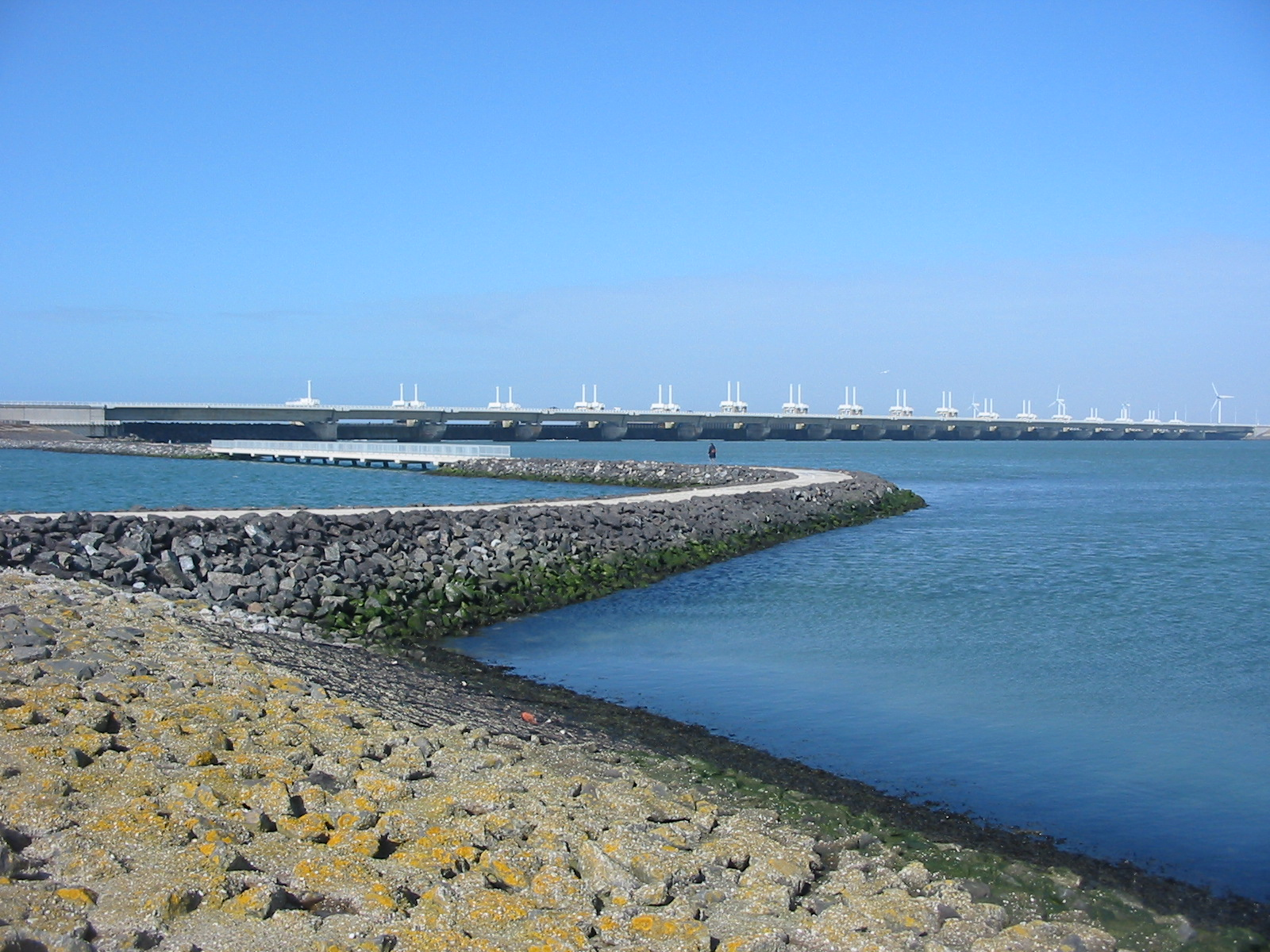
Oosterscheldekering sea wall, the Netherlands.

Coastal management is defence against flooding and erosion, and techniques that stop erosion to claim lands. Protection against rising sea levels in the 21st century is crucial, as sea level rise accelerates due to climate change. Changes in sea level damage beaches and coastal systems are expected to rise at an increasing rate throughout the century, causing coastal sediments to be disturbed by tidal energy.

Coastal zones occupy less than 15% of the Earth's land area, while they host more than 40% of the world population. Nearly 1.2 billion people live within 100 kilometres (62 mi) of a coastline and 100 metres (328 ft) of sea level, with an average density three times higher than the global average for population. With three-quarters of the world population expected to reside in the coastal zone by 2025, human activities originating from this small land area will impose heavy pressure on coasts. Coastal zones contain rich resources to produce goods and services and are home to most commercial and industrial activities.

== History ==
Coastal engineering of harbours began with the origin of maritime traffic, perhaps before 3500 B.C. Docks, breakwaters and other harbour works were built by hand, often in a grand scale. The Romans introduced many innovations in harbour design. They built walls underwater and constructed solid breakwaters. These structures were made using Roman concrete. Vitruvius described three methods for building port structures (De Architectura, 5, 12). Other types of port structure such as rubble mounds and arched breakwaters built by means of timber floating caissons were used also.

Romans were the first dredgers in the Netherlands to maintain the harbour at Velsen. Silting problems there were solved when the previously sealed solid piers were replaced with new "open"-piled jetties. Ancient harbour works are still visible, but most of them disappeared following the fall of the Western Roman Empire even if submerged remains are sometimes still visible under water.

Although most coastal efforts were directed to port structures, Venice and its lagoon is an example of measures not related to ports. Protection of the shore in Italy, England and the Netherlands began in the 6th century or earlier.

=== Middle Ages ===
Attack from the sea caused many coastal towns and their harbours to be abandoned. Other harbours were lost due to natural causes such as rapid silting, shoreline advance or retreat, etc. The Venetian Lagoon was one of the few populated coastal areas with continuous prosperity and development where written reports document the evolution of coastal protection works. In other words, this is one of the first accounts of the use of a sea wall to protect a coastal settlement.

=== Modern Age ===
Little improvement took place beyond the Roman approach to harbour construction after the Renaissance. Then in the early 19th century, the advent of the steam engine, the search for new lands and trade routes, the expansion of the British Empire through her colonies, and other influences, all contributed to the revitalization of sea trade and a renewed interest in port works.

=== Twentieth century ===
Prior to the 1950s, the general practice was to use hard structures to protect against beach erosion or storm damages. These structures included seawalls and revetments or sand-trapping structures such as groynes. During the 1920s and '30s, private or local community interests protected many coastal areas using these techniques on an ad hoc basis. In certain resort areas, structures proliferated to such an extent that the protection impeded recreational uses. Erosion continued, but the structures remained, resulting in a loss of beach area.

The obtrusiveness and cost of these structures led in the late 1940s and early 1950s, to a more dynamic approach. Projects attempted to replicate the protective characteristics of natural beach and dune systems. The resultant use of artificial beaches and stabilized dunes as an engineering approach was economically viable and more environmentally friendly.

Limited knowledge of coastal sediment transport processes often resulted in inappropriate measures of coastal erosion mitigation. In many cases, measures worked locally, but exacerbated problems at other locations -up to tens of kilometers away- or generated other environmental problems.

==== European Code of Conduct ====
The essential source on coastal engineering is the European Code of Conduct for Coastal Zones issued by the European Council in 1999. This document was prepared by the Group of Specialists on Coastal Protection and underlies national legislation and practice.

The Group of Specialists originated in 1995, pursuant to a decision by the Committee of Ministers of the Council of Europe. It emphasized the need for integrated management and planning, but that coastal areas continued to deteriorate. The Group claimed that this was due to difficulties in implementing the concept of "integrated management". The Group proposed that the Council of Europe, cooperate with the Coastal & Marine Union (EUCC) and United Nations Environment Programme (UNEP).

== Planning approaches ==
Five general coastal management strategies

Five generic strategies are involved in coastal defense:

- Abandonment
- Managed retreat or realignment, which plans for retreat and adopts engineering solutions that accommodate natural processes of adjustment
- Armoring by constructing seawalls and other hard structures
- Construct defenses seaward of the coast
- Adapting vertically by elevating land and buildings

The choice of strategy is site-specific, depending on pattern of sea-level change, geomorphological setting, sediment availability and erosion, as well as social, economic and political factors.

Alternatively, integrated coastal zone management approaches may be used to prevent development in erosion- or flood-prone areas, reducing the need to address the changes. Growth management can be a challenge for local authorities who must provide the infrastructure required by new residents.

=== Managed retreat ===
Managed retreat is an alternative to constructing or maintaining coastal structures. Managed retreat allows an area to erode. Managed retreat is often a response to a change in sediment budget or to sea level rise. The technique is used when the land adjacent to the sea is low in value. A decision is made to allow the land to erode and flood, creating new shoreline habitats. This process may continue over many years.

The earliest managed retreat in the UK was an area of 0.8 ha at Northey Island flooded in 1991. This was followed by Tollesbury and Orplands in Essex, where the sea walls were breached in 1995. In the Ebro Delta (Spain) coastal authorities planned a managed retreat.

The main cost is generally the purchase of land to be abandoned. Relocation compensation may be needed. Human-made structures that will be engulfed by the sea may need to be removed. In some cases, armouring is used to protect land beyond the area to be flooded. Costs may be lowest if existing defences are left to fail naturally, but the realignment project may be more actively managed, for example by creating an artificial breach in existing defences to allow the sea in at a particular place in a controlled fashion, or by pre-forming drainage channels for created salt-marsh.

Managed retreat has become more of a necessary strategy due to climate change, as adaptation strategies can only do so much to stop sea level rise.

=== Hold the line ===
Holding the line typically involves shoreline hardening techniques, e.g., using permanent concrete and rock constructions. These techniques--seawalls, groynes, detached breakwaters, and revetments—represent more than 70% of protected shorelines in Europe.

Alternatively, soft engineering techniques supporting natural processes and relying on natural elements such as dunes and vegetation can prevent erosive forces from reaching the back-shore. These techniques include beach nourishment and sand dune stabilization.

Historically coastal strategies were heavily based on static structures, while coastal areas otherwise reflect a dynamic equilibrium. Armouring often has the unintended consequence of moving the problem to another part of the coast. Soft options such as beach nourishment protect coastlines and help to restore the natural dynamism, although they require repeated applications. Maintenance costs can eventually require a strategy change.

=== Move seaward ===
In some cases a seaward strategy can be adopted. Examples from erosion include: Koge Bay (Dk), Western Scheldt estuary (Nl), Chatelaillon (Fr) and Ebro delta (Sp).

There is an obvious downside to this strategy. Coastal erosion is already widespread, and there are many coasts where exceptional high tides or storm surges result in encroachment on the shore, impinging on human activity. If the sea rises, many coasts that are developed with infrastructure along or close to the shoreline will be unable to accommodate erosion. They will experience a so-called "coastal squeeze" whereby ecological or geomorphological zones that would normally retreat landwards encounter solid structures and can migrate no further. Wetlands, salt marshes, mangroves and adjacent fresh water wetlands are particularly vulnerable to such a squeeze.

An upside to the strategy is that moving seaward (and upward) can create land of high value which can bring investment.

=== Limited intervention ===
Limited intervention is an action taken whereby the management only addresses the problem to a certain extent, usually in areas of low economic significance. Limited intervention often includes the succession of haloseres, including salt marshes and sand dunes. This normally results in protecting the land behind the halosere, as wave energy dissipates throughout the accumulated sediment and additional vegetation in the new habitat. Although the halosere is not strictly man-made, as many natural processes contribute to the succession, anthropogenic factors are partially responsible for the formation, since an initial factor was needed to help start the process of succession.

== Construction techniques ==
=== Hard engineering methods ===
==== Groynes ====
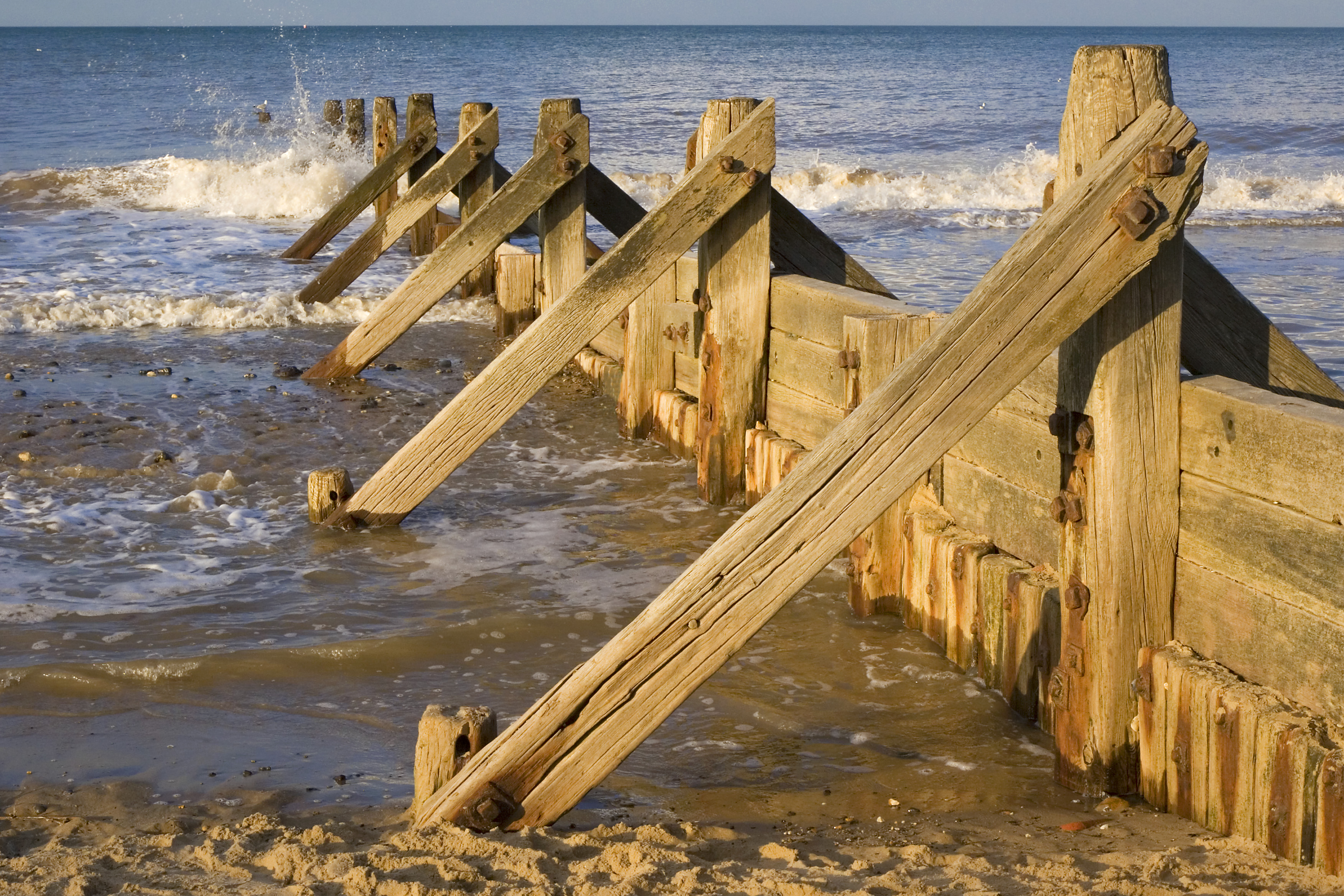
Groyne at Mundesley, Norfolk, UK

Groynes are ert or walls perpendicular to the coastline to trap the sedimentation of longshore drift to gradually create a beach and for it ongoing protection by eliminating coastal erosion, often made of greenharts, concrete, rock or wood. Material builds up on the downdrift side, where littoral drift is predominantly in one direction, creating a wider and a more plentiful beach, thereby protecting the coast because the sand material filters and absorbs wave energy. However, there is a corresponding loss of beach material on the updrift side, requiring another groyne there. Groynes do not protect the beach against storm-driven waves and if placed too close together create currents that carry material offshore. Shapes of groynes can be straight, outwardly curved away in opposite direction from downdrift.

Groynes are cost-effective, require little maintenance and are one of the most common defences. However, groynes are increasingly viewed as detrimental to the aesthetics of the coastline and face opposition in many coastal communities.

Groynes can be considered a "soft" solution because of the beach enhancement.

Groyne construction creates a problem known as terminal groyne syndrome. The terminal groyne prevents longshore drift from bringing material to other nearby places. This is a problem along the Hampshire and Sussex coastline in the UK; e.g., at Worthing.

==== Seawalls ====
Walls of concrete and masonry are used to protect a settlement against erosion or flooding. They are typically about 3–5 metres (10–16 ft) high. Older-style vertical seawalls reflected all the energy of the waves back out to sea, and for this purpose were often given recurved crest walls which increased local turbulence, and thus increased entrainment of sand and sediment. During storms, sea walls help longshore drift.

Modern seawalls aim to re-direct most of the incident energy in the form of sloping revetments, resulting in low reflected waves and much reduced turbulence. Designs use porous designs of rock, concrete armour (Tetrapods, Seabees, SHEDs, Xblocs, etc.) with flights of steps for beach access.

The location of a seawall, must consider the swept prism of the beach profile, the consequences of long-term beach recession and amenity crest level, including cost implications.

Sea walls can cause beaches to dissipate. Their presence also alters the landscape that they are trying to protect.

Modern examples can be found at Cronulla (NSW, 1985–6), Blackpool (1986–2001), Lincolnshire (1992–1997) and Wallasey (1983–1993). At Sandwich, Kent the Seabee seawall is buried at the back of the beach under the shingle with crest level at road kerb level.

Sea walls typically cost £10,000 per metre (depending on material, height and width), £10,000,000 per km (depending on material, height and width).

==== Revetments ====
Revetments are slanted or upright blockades, built parallel to the coast, usually towards the back of the beach to protect the area beyond. The most basic revetments consist of timber slants with a possible rock infill. Waves break against the revetments, which dissipate and absorb the energy. The shoreline is protected by the beach material held behind the barriers, as the revetments trap some of the material. They may be watertight, covering the slope completely, or porous, to allow water to filter through after the wave energy has been dissipated. Most revetments do not significantly interfere with transport of longshore drift. Since the wall absorbs energy instead of reflecting, the surf progressively erodes and destroys the revetment; therefore, maintenance is ongoing, as determined by the structural material and product quality.

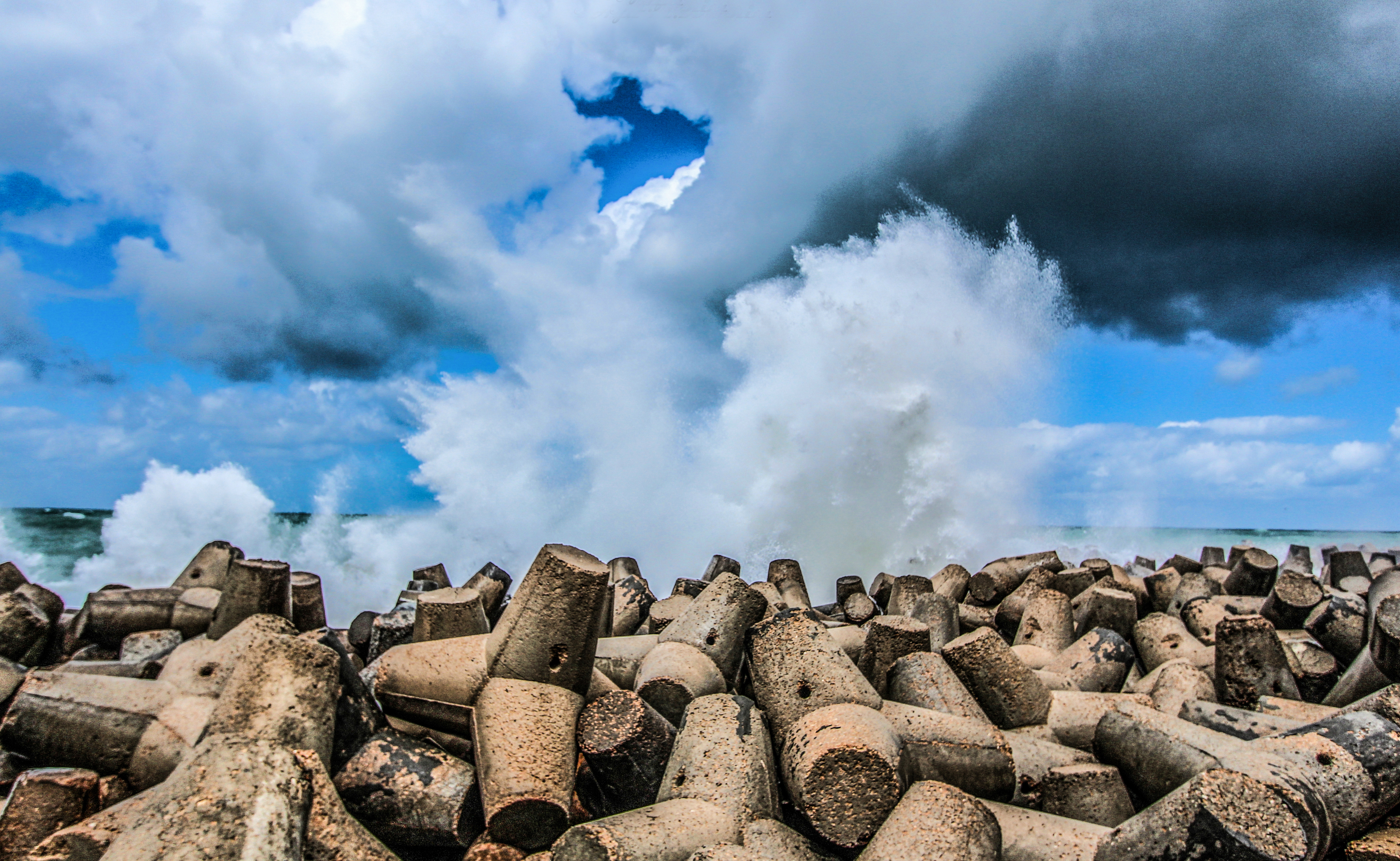
Cement beach reinforcements in on the coast of Alexandria, Egypt to prevent further erosion of coastline that is vulnerable to subsidence.

==== Rock armour ====
Rock armour is large rocks placed at the sea edge using local material. This is generally used to absorb wave energy and hold beach material. Although effective, this solution is unpopular for aesthetic reasons. Longshore drift is not hindered. Rock armour has a limited lifespan, is not effective in storm conditions and reduces recreational values.

==== Geotextile tubes ====
Geotextile tubes or geotubes are large geotextile bags placed at the sea edge filled with locally available sand slurry. This is generally used to absorb wave energy and hold beach material as riprap does. Often referred to as titan tubes as manufactured by Flint Technical Geosolutions. Longshore drift is not hindered.

==== Gabions ====
Boulders and rocks are wired into mesh cages and placed in front of areas vulnerable to erosion: sometimes at cliffs edges or at right angles to the beach. When the ocean lands on the gabion, the water drains through leaving sediment, while the structure absorbs a moderate amount of wave energy.

Gabions need to be securely tied to protect the structure.

Downsides include wear rates and visual intrusiveness.

==== Offshore breakwater ====
Concrete blocks and/or boulders are sunk offshore to alter wave direction and to filter wave and tide energy. The waves break further offshore and therefore lose erosive power. This leads to wider beaches, which further absorb wave energy. Dolos has replaced the use of concrete blocks because it is more resistant to wave action and requires less concrete to produce a superior result. Similar concrete objects like Dolos are A-jack, Akmon, Xbloc, Tetrapod and Accropode.

==== Cliff stabilization ====
Cliff stabilization can be accomplished through drainage of excess rainwater of through terracing, planting and wiring to hold cliffs in place.

==== Entrance training walls ====
Training walls are built to constrain a river or creek as it discharges across a sandy coastline. The walls stabilise and deepen the channel which benefits navigation, flood management, river erosion and water quality, but can cause coastal erosion by interrupting longshore drift. One solution is a sand bypassing system to pump sand under/around the training walls.

==== Floodgates ====
Storm surge barriers, or floodgates, were introduced after the North Sea Flood of 1953 and prevent damage from storm surges or any other type of natural disaster that could harm the area they protect. They are habitually open and allow free passage, but close under threat of a storm surge. The Thames Barrier is an example of such a structure.

=== Soft engineering methods ===
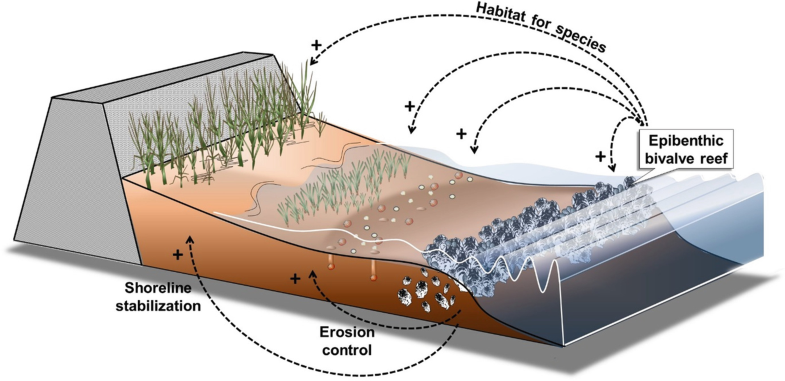
Ecosystem services delivered by epibenthic bivalve reefs Reefs provide coastal protection through erosion control and shoreline stabilization, and modify the physical landscape by ecosystem engineering, thereby providing habitat for species by facilitative interactions with other habitats such as tidal flat benthic communities, seagrasses and marshes.

==== Beach replenishment ====
Beach replenishment/nourishment involves importing sand from elsewhere and adding it to the existing beach. The imported sand should be of a similar quality to the existing beach material so it can meld with the natural local processes and without adverse effects. Beach nourishment can be used in combination with groynes. The scheme requires repeated applications on an annual or multi-year cycle.

=== Sand Dune Stabilization ===
Sand dunes are a common feature of beaches and provide a habitat for many organisms. They are useful when preventing the erosion of beaches, and can catch windblown sand which over time increases the natural formation of the beach. To stabilize sand dunes, foredune flora and backdune flora are planted. Foredune flora are typically plants with a tolerance for salt spray, strong winds and are capable surviving being buried underneath blown sand. Some examples are Ammophila arenaria, Honckenya peploides, Cakile maritima, and Spartina coarctata. Whereas backdune flora grow into dense patches called dune mats, which helps to hold dune structure. Examples of backdune flora are Hudsonia tomentosa, spartina patens, and Iva imbricata. After these plants have taken root, the shrub stage begins. Since the previously established plants have stabilized the dunes, during the shrub stage larger plants with bigger root systems are able to grow. This allows for further stabilization of sand dunes. These larger plants, along with wooden sand fences, footpaths, Dutch ladders and boardwalks help to catch windblown sand.

Stabilizing sand dunes with plants is a common practice and can be implemented on private and public beaches. When implementing the stabilization sand dunes on privately owned beaches with multiple owners, coming to a consensual agreement tends to be complicated. Some owners may prefer to leave the dunes bare, while others would rather plant more visually appealing plants. In comparison, when implementing dune stabilization on publicly owned beaches, there are less parties to confer with. Therefore, agreements about implementation can be reached in a quicker fashion.

Sand dunes are vulnerable to human activities. Therefore, they need as little human interaction as possible for their protection. Human coastal activities has led to the erosion and loss of plant life on sand dunes. Plant life has been established as an important stabilizing factor of sand dunes and the loss of it will cause more erosion. To prevent this, noticeboards, leaflets, and beach wardens explain to visitors how to avoid damaging the area. Also, beach areas can be closed to the public to reduce damage. Another option is fences which allow sand traps to create blowouts and increase windblown sand capture.

==== Beach drainage ====
Beach drainage or beach face dewatering lowers the water table locally beneath the beach face. This causes accretion of sand above the drainage system.

Beach watertables have an important bearing on deposition/erosion across the foreshore. In one study a high watertable coincided with accelerated beach erosion, while a low watertable coincided with pronounced aggradation of the foreshore. A lower watertable (unsaturated beach face) facilitates deposition by reducing flow velocities during backwash and prolonging laminar flow. With the beach in a saturated state, backwash velocity is accelerated by the addition of groundwater seepage out of the beach within the effluent zone.

However, no case studies provide indisputable evidence of positive results, although in some cases overall positive performance was reported. Long-term monitoring was not undertaken at a frequency high enough to discriminate the response to high energy erosive events.

A useful side effect of the system is that collected seawater is relatively pure because of sand's filtration effect. Such water may be discharged or be used to oxygenate stagnant inland lagoons/marinas or used as feed for heat pumps, desalination plants, land-based aquaculture, aquariums or swimming pools.

Beach drainage systems have been installed in many locations around the world to halt and reverse erosion trends in sand beaches. Between 1981 and 2015, twenty four beach drainage systems have been installed in Denmark, USA, UK, Japan, Spain, Sweden, France, Italy and Malaysia.

==== Buffer zones ====
Coastal and estuarine ecosystems act as buffer zones against natural hazards and environmental disturbances, such as floods, cyclones, tidal surges and storms. The role they play is to "[absorb] a portion of the impact and thus [lessen] its effect on the land". Wetlands (which include saltwater swamps, salt marshes, ...) and the vegetation it supports – trees, root mats, etc. – retain large amounts of water (surface water, snowmelt, rain, groundwater) and then slowly releases them back, decreasing the likeliness of floods. Mangrove forests protect coastal shorelines from tidal erosion or erosion by currents; a process that was studied after the 1999 cyclone that hit India. Villages that were surrounded with mangrove forests encountered less damages than other villages that weren't protected by mangroves.

==== Costs ====
The costs of installation and operation vary due to:

- system length (non-linear cost elements)
- pump flow rates (sand permeability, power costs)
- soil conditions (presence of rock or impermeable strata)
- discharge arrangement /filtered seawater utilization
- drainage design, materials selection & installation methods
- geographical considerations (location logistics)
- regional economic considerations (local capabilities /costs)
- study requirements /consent process.

== Monitoring ==
Coastal managers must compensate for error and uncertainty in the information regarding the erosive processes. Video-based monitoring can collect data continuously and produce analyses of shoreline processes.

=== Event warning systems ===
Event warning systems, such as tsunami warnings and storm surge warnings, can be used to minimize the human impact of catastrophic events that cause coastal erosion. Storm surge warnings can help determine when to close floodgates.

Wireless sensor networks can aid monitoring.

=== Shoreline mapping ===
Defining the shoreline is a difficult task due to its dynamic nature and the intended application. The relevant mapping scale is dependent on the context of the investigation. Generally, the coast comprises the interface between land and sea, and the shoreline is represented by the margin between the two. Investigators adopt the use of shoreline indicators to represent the true shoreline position.

==== Shoreline indicator ====
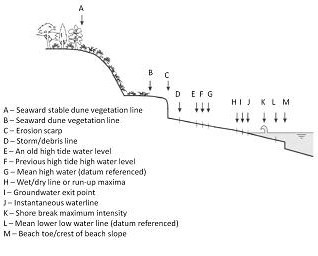
Figure 1. A diagram representing the spatial relationship between many of the commonly used indicators.

The choice of shoreline indicator is a primary consideration. Indicators must be easily identified in the field and on aerial photography. Shoreline indicators may be morphological features such as the berm crest, scarp edge, vegetation line, dune toe, dune crest and cliff or the bluff crest and toe. Alternatively, non-morphological features may be used such as water level (high water line (HWL), mean high water line) wet/dry boundary and the physical water line. Figure 1 provides a sketch of the spatial relationships between commonly used shoreline indicators.

The HWL (H in Figure 1) is the most commonly used shoreline indicator because it is visible in the field, and can be interpreted on both colour and grey scale aerial photographs. The HWL represents the landward extent of the most recent high tide and is characterised by a change in sand colour due to repeated, periodic inundation by high tides. The HWL is portrayed on aerial photographs by the most landward change in colour or grey tone.

==== Importance and application ====
The shoreline location and its changing position over time is of fundamental importance to coastal scientists, engineers and managers. Shoreline monitoring campaigns provide information about historic shoreline location and movement, and about predictions of future change. More specifically the position of the shoreline in the past, at present and where it is predicted to be in the future is useful for in the design of coastal protection, to calibrate and verify numerical models to assess sea level rise, map hazard zones and to regulate coastal development. The location of the shoreline also provides information regarding shoreline reorientation adjacent to structures, beach width, volume and rates of historical change.

==== Data sources ====
A variety of data sources are available for examining shoreline position. However, the availability of historical data is limited at many coastal sites and so the choice of data source is largely limited to what is available for the site at a given time. Shoreline mapping techniques have become more automated. The frequent changes in technology prevented the emergence of one standard mapping approach. Each data source and associated method have capabilities and shortcomings.

===== Historical maps =====
In the event that a study requires the shoreline position from before aerial photographs, or if the location has poor photographic coverage, historical maps provide an alternative. Many errors are associated with early maps and charts. Such errors may be associated with scale, datum changes, distortions from uneven shrinkage, stretching, creases, tears and folds, different surveying standards, different publication standards and projection errors. The severity of these errors depends on the accuracy of the map and the physical changes that occurred after it was made. The oldest reliable source of shoreline data in the United States dates is the United States Coast Survey T-sheets and dates to the early-to-mid-19th century. In the United Kingdom, many pre-1750 maps and charts were deemed to be inaccurate. The founding of the Ordnance Survey in 1791 improved mapping accuracy.

===== Aerial photographs =====
Aerial photographs began to be used in the 1920s to provide topographical data. They provide a good database for compilation of shoreline change maps. Aerial photographs are the most commonly used data source because many coastal areas have extensive aerial photo coverage.Aerial photographs generally provide good spatial coverage. However, temporal coverage is site specific. The interpretation of shoreline position is subjective given the dynamic nature of the coastal environment. This combined with various distortions inherent in aerial photographs can lead to significant error levels. The minimisation of further errors is discussed below.

====== Object space displacements ======
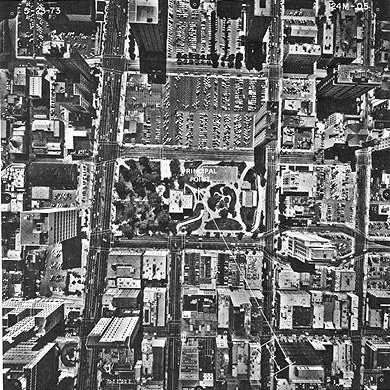
Figure 2. An example of relief displacement. All objects above ground level are displaced outwards from the centre of the photograph. The displacement becomes more evident near the edges.

Conditions outside of the camera can cause objects in an image to appear displaced from their true ground position. Such conditions may include ground relief, camera tilt and atmospheric refraction.

Relief displacement is prominent when photographing a variety of elevations. This situation causes objects above sea level to be displaced outward from the centre of the photograph and objects below ground level to be displaced toward the centre of the image (Figure 2). The severity of the displacement is negatively associated with decreases in flight altitude and as radial distance from the centre of the photograph increases. This distortion can be minimised by photographing multiple swaths and creating a mosaic of the images. This technique creates a focus for the centre of each photograph where distortion is minimised. This error is not common in shoreline mapping as the relief is fairly constant. It is however important to consider when mapping cliffs.

Ideally aerial photographs are taken so the optical axis of the camera is perfectly perpendicular to the ground surface, thereby creating a vertical photograph. Unfortunately this is often not the case and virtually all aerial photographs experience tilt up to 3°. In this situation the scale of the image is larger on the upward side of the tilt axis and smaller on the downward side. Many coastal researchers do not consider this in their work.

====== Radial lens distortion ======
Lens distortion varies as a function of radial distance from the iso-centre of the photograph meaning that the centre of the image is relatively distortion free, but as the angle of view increases distortion. This is a significant source of error in earlier aerial photography. Such a distortion is impossible to correct for without knowing the details of the lens used to capture the image. Overlapping images can be used to resolve errors.

====== Shoreline delineation ======
The dynamic nature of coasts compromises shoreline mapping. This uncertainty arises because at any given time the position of the shoreline is influenced by the immediate tidal effects and a variety of long-term effects such as relative sea-level rise and along shore littoral sediment movement. This affects the accuracy of computed historic shoreline position and predictions. HWL is most commonly used as a shoreline indicator. Many errors are associated with using the wet/dry line as a proxy for the HWL and shoreline. The errors of largest concern are the short-term migration of the wet/dry line, interpretation of the wet/dry line on a photograph and measurement of the interpreted line position. Systematic errors such as the migration of the wet/dry line arise from tidal and seasonal changes. Erosion may cause the wet/dry line to migrate. Field investigations have shown that these changes can be minimised by using only summertime data.; Furthermore, the error bar can be significantly reduced by using the longest record of reliable data to calculate erosion rates. Errors may arise due to the difficulty of measuring a single line on a photograph. For example, where the pen line is 0.13 mm thick this translates to an error of ±2.6 m on a 1:20000 scale photograph.

===== Beach profiling surveys =====
Beach profiling surveys are typically repeated at regular intervals along the coast in order to measure short-term (daily to annual) variations in shoreline position and beach volume. Beach profiling is a very accurate source of information. However, measurements are generally subject to the limitations of conventional surveying techniques. Shoreline data derived from beach profiling is often spatially and temporally limited due to the high cost associated with that labour-intensive activity. Shorelines are generally derived by interpolating from a series of discrete beach profiles. The distance between the profiles is usually quite large, limiting the accuracy of the interpolating. Survey data is limited to smaller lengths of shoreline generally less than ten kilometres. Beach profiling data is commonly available in from regional councils in New Zealand.

===== Remote sensing =====
A range of airborne, satellite and land based remote sensing techniques can provide additional, mappable data. Remotely sensed data sources include:

- Multispectral and hyperspectral imaging
- Microwave sensors
- Global positioning system (GPS)
- Airborne light detection and ranging technology (LIDAR)

Remote sensing techniques can be cost effective, reduce manual error and reduce the subjectivity of conventional field techniques. Remote sensing is a relatively new concept, limiting extensive historical observations. Coastal morphology observations must be quantified by coupling remotely sensed data with other sources of information detailing historic shoreline position from archived sources.

===== Video analysis =====
Video analysis provides quantitative, cost-effective, continuous and long-term monitoring beaches. The advancement of coastal video systems in the twenty-first century enabled the extraction of large amounts of geophysical data from images. The data describes coastal morphology, surface currents and wave parameters. The main advantage of video analysis lies in the ability to reliably quantify these parameters with high resolution space and time coverage. This highlights their potential as an effective coastal monitoring system and an aid to coastal zone management. Interesting case studies have been carried out using video analysis. One group used a video-based ARGUS coastal imaging system to monitor and quantify the regional-scale coastal response to sand nourishment and construction of the world-first Gold Coast artificial surfing reef in Australia. Another assessed the added value of high resolution video observations for short-term predictions of near shore hydrodynamic and morphological processes, at temporal scales of meters to kilometres and days to seasons.

Video analysis gives coastal zone managers the opportunity to obtain bathymetry. It can be used to obtain inter-tidal topographies and sub-tidal bathymetries and measure coastal zone resilience [as in available beach volume as well as sub-tidal bar configuration]. Video-based depth estimations were applied in micro/meso tidal environments at DUCK, NC and highly energetic wave climates with a macro tidal regime at Porthtowan in the United Kingdom. The latter showed the application of video-based depth estimations during extreme storms.

== See also ==
- Beach erosion and accretion
  - Beach evolution
  - Beach nourishment
  - Modern recession of beaches
  - Raised beach
- Integrated coastal zone management
  - Coastal and oceanic landforms
  - Coastal development hazards
  - Coastal erosion
  - Coastal geography
    - Cuspate foreland
    - Detention basin
  - Coastal engineering
    - Hard engineering
      - Accropode
      - Xbloc
    - Soft engineering
  - Coastal morphodynamics
  - Coastal and Estuarine Research Federation (CERF)
  - Human impacts on coasts
  - Sea level rise
  - Mangrove restoration
  - Natural hazard
  - Restoration of saltwater swamps
  - Restoration of salt marshes
  - List of countries by length of coastline
- Erosion
  - Bioerosion
  - Blowhole
  - Natural arch
  - Wave-cut platform
- Longshore drift
  - Deposition (sediment)
  - Coastal sediment supply
  - Longshore transport
  - Sand dune stabilization
  - Submersion
