= Cliff stabilization =

Soil conservation technique

Cliff stabilization is a coastal management erosion control technique. This is most suitable for softer or less stable cliffs. Generally speaking, the cliffs are stabilised through dewatering (drainage of excess rainwater to reduce water-logging) or anchoring (the use of terracing, planting, wiring or concrete supports to hold cliffs in place).
