= Soft engineering =

Shoreline management based on sustainability principles

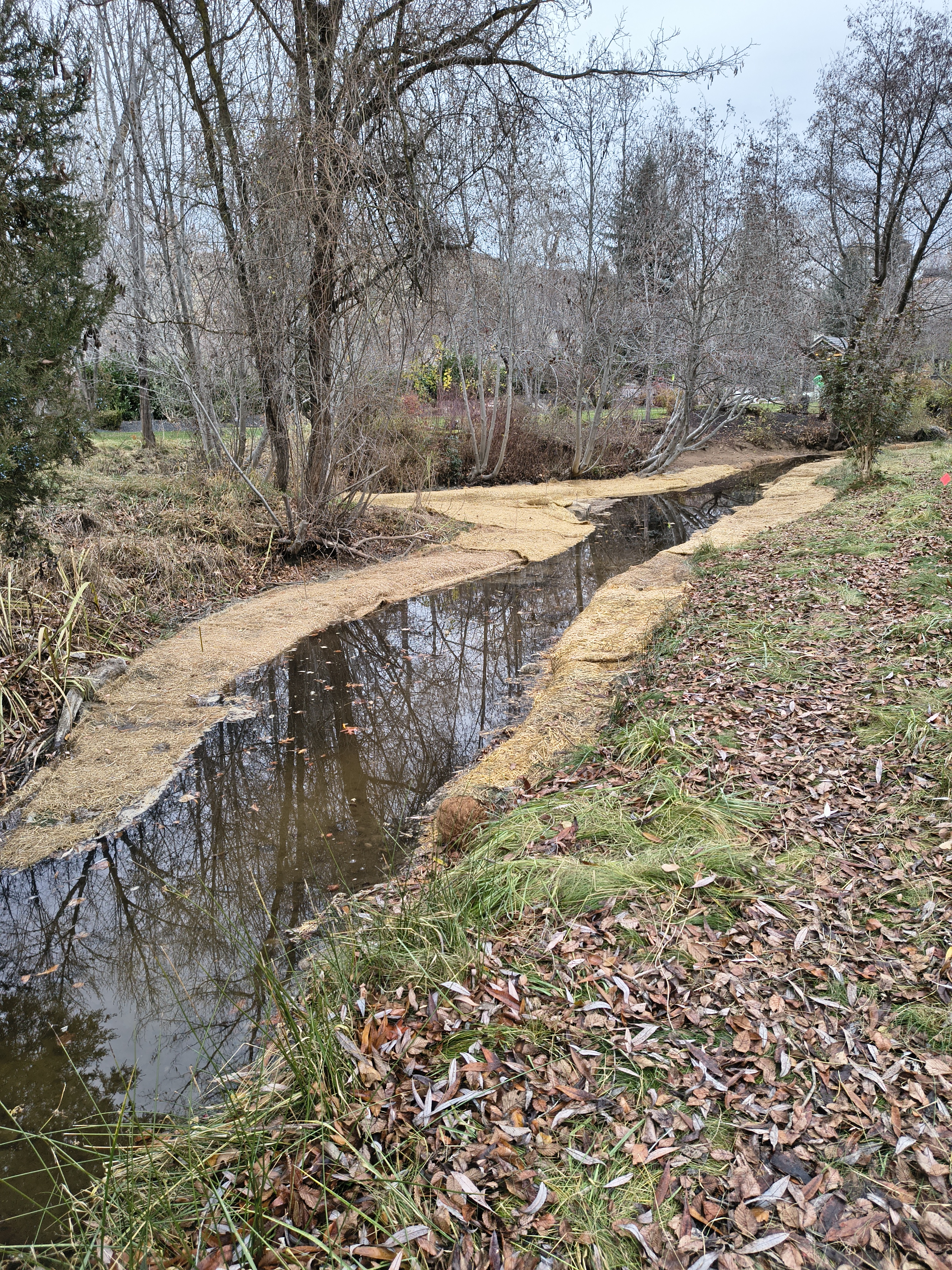
Coir logs in a pilot project for trout reintroduction in a subdivision creek, settled the day after the reintroduction of water flow.

Regarding the civil engineering of shorelines, soft engineering is a shoreline management practice that uses sustainable ecological principles to restore shoreline stabilization and protect riparian habitats. Soft Shoreline Engineering (SSE) uses the strategic placement of organic materials such as vegetation, stones, sand, debris, and other structural materials to reduce erosion, enhance shoreline aesthetic, soften the land-water interface, and lower costs of ecological restoration.

To differentiate Soft Shoreline Engineering from Hard Shoreline Engineering, Hard Shoreline Engineering tends to use steel sheet piling or concrete breakwalls to prevent danger and fortify shorelines. Generally, Hard Shoreline Engineering is used for navigational or industrial purposes. To contrast, Soft Shoreline Engineering emphasizes the application of ecological principles rather than compromising the engineered integrity of the shoreline. The opposite alternative is hard engineering.

== Background ==
Hard shoreline engineering is the use of non-organic reinforcing materials, such as concrete, steel, and plastic to fortify shorelines, stop erosion, and protect urban development from flooding. However, as shoreline development among coastal cities increased dramatically, the detrimental ecological factors became apparent. Hard shoreline engineering was designed to accommodate human development along the coast, focusing on increasing efficiency in the commercial, navigational, and industrial sectors of the economy. In 2003, the global population living within 120 miles (190 km) of an ocean was 3 billion and is expected to double by the year 2025. These developments came at a high cost, destroying biological communities, isolating riparian habitats, altering the natural transport of sediment by disrupting wave action and long-shore currents. Many coastal regions began to see significant coastal degradation due to human development, the Detroit River losing as great as 97% of its coastal wetland habitats. Singapore, as well, documented the disappearance of the majority of its mangrove forests, coastal reefs, and mudflat regions between 1920 and 1990 due to shoreline development.

Towards the end of the 20th century, coastal engineering practices underwent a gradual transition towards incorporating the natural environment into planning considerations. In stark contrast to hard engineering, employed with the sole purpose of improving navigation, industrial and commercial uses of the river, soft engineering takes a multi-faceted approach, developing shorelines for a multitude of benefits and incorporating consideration of fish and wildlife habitat. Tasked with the responsibility to construct and maintain United States Federally authorized coastal civil works projects, the U.S. Army Corps of Engineers plays a major part in the development of the principles of coastal engineering as practiced within the U.S. In part due to degradation of coastline across the United States, the Corps has since updated its coastal management practices with an increased emphasis on computer-based modeling, project upkeep, and environmental restoration. However, soft and hard engineering are not mutually exclusive; a blend of the two management practices can be used to design waterfronts, especially for high flow bodies of water.

== Principles of Soft Shoreline Engineering ==
- Imitate Nature - Imitating the characteristics of the natural environment is critical to the success of soft engineering efforts. Existing traits of a landscape provide telltale signs of the geomorphic forces at play. Trying to add vegetation to a barren area with high winds will not produce the intended results.
- Gentle Slopes - Gentle slopes are most commonly found in the natural environment and are the most stable under the forces of gravity. Gradually inclined slopes along banks and shorelines allow for the dissipation of wave energy over a greater distance, reducing the force of erosion.
- "Soft Armoring" - Soft armoring includes the use of materials such as live plants, shrubs, root wads, logs, vegetative mats, etc. These materials, which are alive, can adapt to changes in the environment and help maintain regular coastal processes by disrupting the natural shoreline in the least way possible. Soft armoring is also paramount to enhancing shoreline habitats and improving water quality.
- Material Variety - A variety of textures and vegetation enhances aesthetic, diversifies the natural landscape, and maximizes biodiversity. Native plants and endangered or threatened species should be used whenever possible. The use of locally abundant and easily accessible natural resources also cuts development costs significantly.

== Techniques ==
=== Planting ===
The most basic and fundamental form of soft shoreline engineering is adding native vegetation to degraded or damaged shoreline areas to bolster the structural integrity of the soil. The deep roots of the vegetation bind the soil together, strengthening the structural integrity of the soil and preventing it from cracking apart and crumbling into the body of water. An added layer of vegetation also protects embankments from corrosive forces such as rain and wind.

=== Rolled Erosion Control Products (RECP) ===
Rolled erosion control products are blankets or netting created with both natural and synthetic materials used to protect the surface of the ground from erosive forces and promote the growth of vegetation. RECPs are often used in locations highly susceptible to erosion, such as steep slopes, channels, and areas where natural vegetation is sparse. These products aid the growth of vegetation by protecting soil from raindrops, keeping seed in place, and maintaining moisture and temperature parameters consistent with plant growth. The typical composition of an RECP includes seed, fertilizer, degradable stakes, and a binding material. Although design varies by manufacturer, most RECPs are biodegradable or photodegradable and decompose after a given amount of time.

=== Coir Logs ===
Erosion control coir logs are natural fiber products designed to stabilize soil by supporting erosion prone areas such as river banks, slopes, hills, and streams. Coir is coconut fiber extracted from the outer husk of a coconut and used in products such as ropes, mats, and nets. Like RECPs, coir logs are natural and biodegradable, being composed primarily of densely packed coir fibers held together by a tubular coir twine netting. Coir fiber is strong and water resistant, making it a durable barrier against waves and river currents. Multiple sections of coir log can be joined by twine to provide erosion control and prevention to vulnerable areas. Coir logs can also be vegetated and used to establish root systems of native plants along wetland edges.

=== Live Stakes and Fascines ===
Lives stakes and fascines are a specific tree or shrub species that thrive in moist soil conditions and can be strategically used to stabilize stream banks and shorelines. Live stakes are hardwood cuttings with the branches removed that, when planted in moist soil, will grow new plants from the stems of the cut branches. They can be used alone, implanted into 2-inch (5 cm) pilot holes in the soil, or used as a device to secure other bioengineering materials such as rolled erosion control products and coir logs. Fascines are similar live branches strapped together and laid horizontally across streambank contours to impede or prevent the flow of water and curb erosion.

=== Brush Mattress ===
Brush mattresses, also known as live brush mats or brush matting, is a technique used to form immediate protective cover of a streambank. Brush mattresses are dense compilations of live stakes, fascines, and branch cuttings held down with additional stakes to protect the embankment. The brush mattress is intended to eventually take root and enhance the conditions for the colonization of native plants. Along with aiding in the restoration of riparian habitats, this product intercepts sediment flowing downstream and provides a number of benefits for fish and aquatic species by offering physical protection from predators, regulating the water temperature, and shading the stream.

=== Live Cribwalls ===
Live crib walls are structures that resemble that of a wooden log cabin built into a streambank and rilled with natural materials such as soil, dormant wood cuttings, and rock. The live crib wall is able to fortify stream banks with the combination of the sturdy log structure and the root mass that will sprout from the wood cuttings and take hold deep in the bank, armoring it from erosion. Although quite labor-intensive, cribwalls can last for decades and provide excellent aquatic habitats under the surface of the body of water. Cribwalls have the ability to prevent the occurrence of a split channel in a stream but should not be used in streams with downcutting as the base of the structure will be compromised.

=== Encapsulated Soil Lifts ===
Encapsulated soil lifts are a technique that "encapsulates" soil in a biodegradable blanket and organized on a slope in such a way that creates the desired stream bank slope. The layers of soil, or lifts, are used to stabilize the banks of moderate to high level energy shorelines. Once constructed, the lifts are planted with the seeds of native flowers, shrubs and grasses. In addition to reducing dirt erosion in the body of water, soil lifts protect water quality and the encompassed riparian habitats.

=== Vegetated Riprap ===
Vegetated riprap is a soft shoreline engineering technique that is an alternative to conventional riprap for erosion protection. Conventional riprap is a form of rock armor, rubble, or concrete used to fortify shoreline structures against the forces of erosion. Vegetated riprap is a more economically efficient form of shoreline protection that enhances fish and wildlife habitat as well as softening the appearance and improving embankment aesthetic. Vegetated riprap incorporated native vegetation along with rocks to create live cuttings in the bank. This technique improves the natural habitat of aquatic species along with armoring the banks and redirecting water flows.

=== Geo Bags ===
Geo bags or erosion control bags/tubes act as sediment removing filters, protecting against shoreline erosion by trapping sludge and sand particles and preventing them from leaving the coastal area. The bags are designed to allow the natural flow of water to filter in and out without inhibition, limiting disruption to the coastline. These geo bags or tubes are designed to look natural in the coastal environment, as opposed to concrete alternatives, and are built to endure the outdoors. Geo bag material is typically composed of geotextile fabric and can be designed for different specifications.

== Best Management Practices ==
In order to incorporate principles of soft engineering into practice, shorelines must be redeveloped to achieve multiple objectives. For example, soft shoreline engineering has the ability to decrease costs, stabilize banks, enhance aesthetic value, protect riparian habitats, expand public access, and support a diversity of wildlife. To achieve the goal of multiple objectives for waterfront development and design, a multi-disciplinary team must be formed to integrate environmental, social, and economic principles.

The first step in implementing soft engineering is conducting a preliminary assessment of the site and determining whether soft engineering is applicable and practical. A typical assessment includes identifying the extent of the project area, evaluating existing uses, documenting amenities and characteristics such as habitats, species, public access, development, and considering impact of future desired use. If the team decides the site is fit to implement soft engineering, a complex process is designed in order to achieve the predetermined goals of the development and complete with objectives. Standards and targets must then be created to measure project development and progress. Interdisciplinary partnerships must be established at an early stage in the process to ensure the incorporation of environmental, social, and economic values, as well as target objectives implemented to measure progress. Priorities and alternative are established, with the team working together to decide on the best management practices to achieve maximum effectiveness. After best management practices have been determined and incorporated, project success is based upon the meeting of objectives and effective preservation and conservation efforts.

== Case Studies ==
=== Greater Detroit American Heritage River Initiative ===
In 1998, the President of the United States created the American Heritage River Initiative to restore and revitalize rivers and waterfronts through the use of newly introduced soft engineering techniques. A report by Schneider reported that 47.2% of the U.S. and Canadian Detroit River had been fortified with concrete or steel, in accordance with traditional hard engineering management practices. In 1999, a U.S. Canadian SSE conference developed the best management practices for SSE use, which was put into effect among the 38 SSE projects that took place in the Detroit River-western Lake Erie watershed. A grand total of $17.3 million was spent on these projects which aimed to improve riparian and aquatic habitat, restore natural shoreline, and treat stormwater. The study found that the economic benefits to ecological restoration are profound and provide compelling evidence for further investigation and investment into shoreline rehabilitation processes. Researchers also found that SSE not only improved the natural habitat, but from a social perspective, the efforts aided in reconnecting people to nature, fostering a sense of human attachment to the success and health of these waterfronts.

=== Mississippi ===
Beginning with British colonial establishment in 1819, Mississippi's coastline has undergone an extensive history of decline through alteration and land reclamation. Hilton and Manning found that from the period of 1922 to 1993, the area of mangroves, coral reefs, and intertidal mudflats decreased dramatically, the actual percentage of natural coastline dropping from 96 to 40%. In order to combat these deleterious anthropogenic effects, Mississippi's government came up with a Master Plan in 2008 which incorporated the modification of shorelines in accordance with the ecological principles of soft engineering. A study regarding the success of ecological engineering in Singapore found that the most effective way to introduce ecological principles into shoreline design and preservation is to implement a top down approach that coordinates and educates the multitude of agencies that are involved in coastal management. Mississippi's loss of natural coastline is just one example of the inevitable detriment of intensive human development and soft engineering techniques provide an effective way to balance shoreline conservation and restoration with the urban development that is sure to continue.

== See also ==
- Hard engineering
- Ecological Engineering
- Erosion Control
