= Seawall =

Form of coastal defence

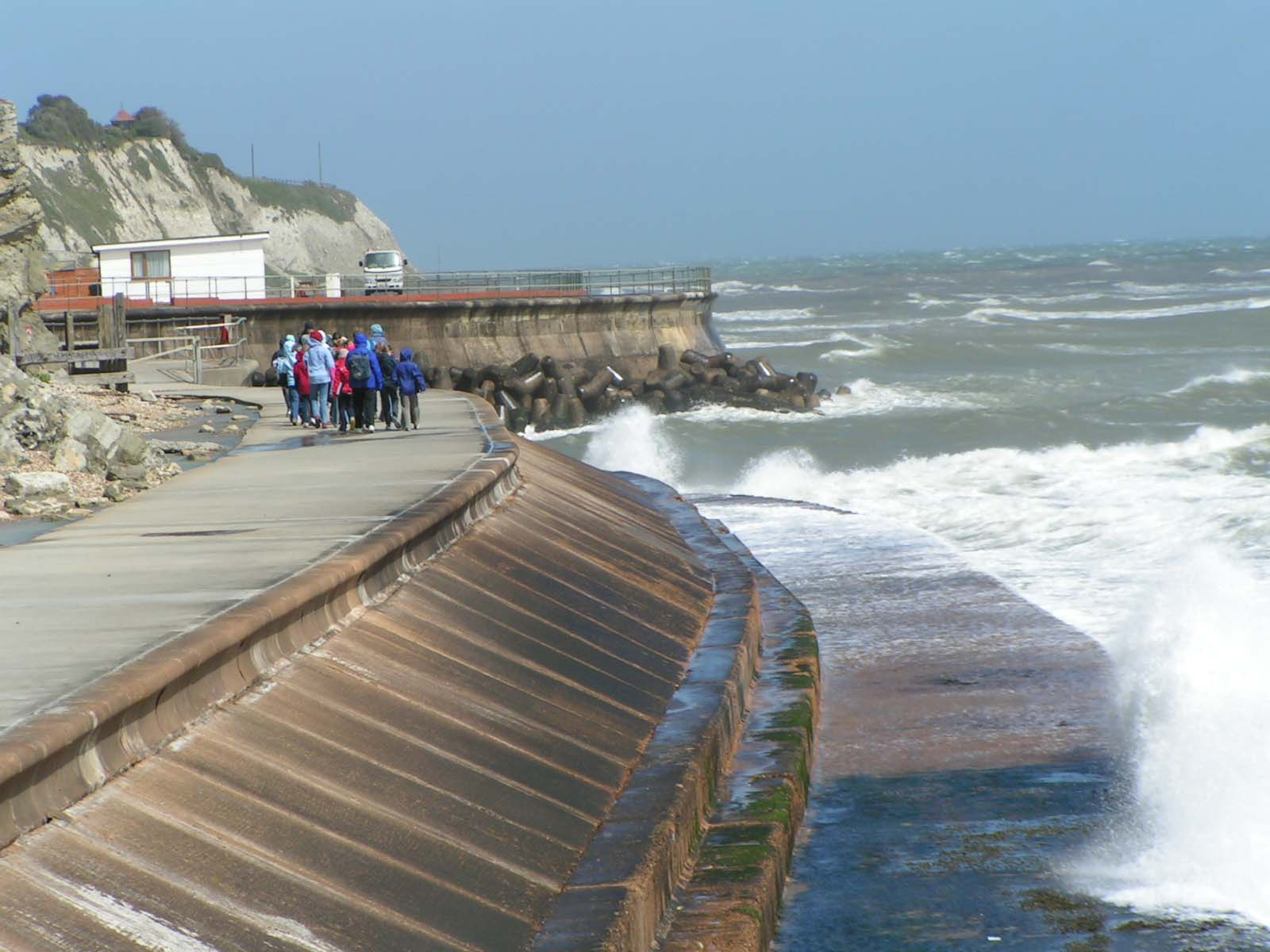
An example of a modern seawall in Ventnor on the Isle of Wight, England

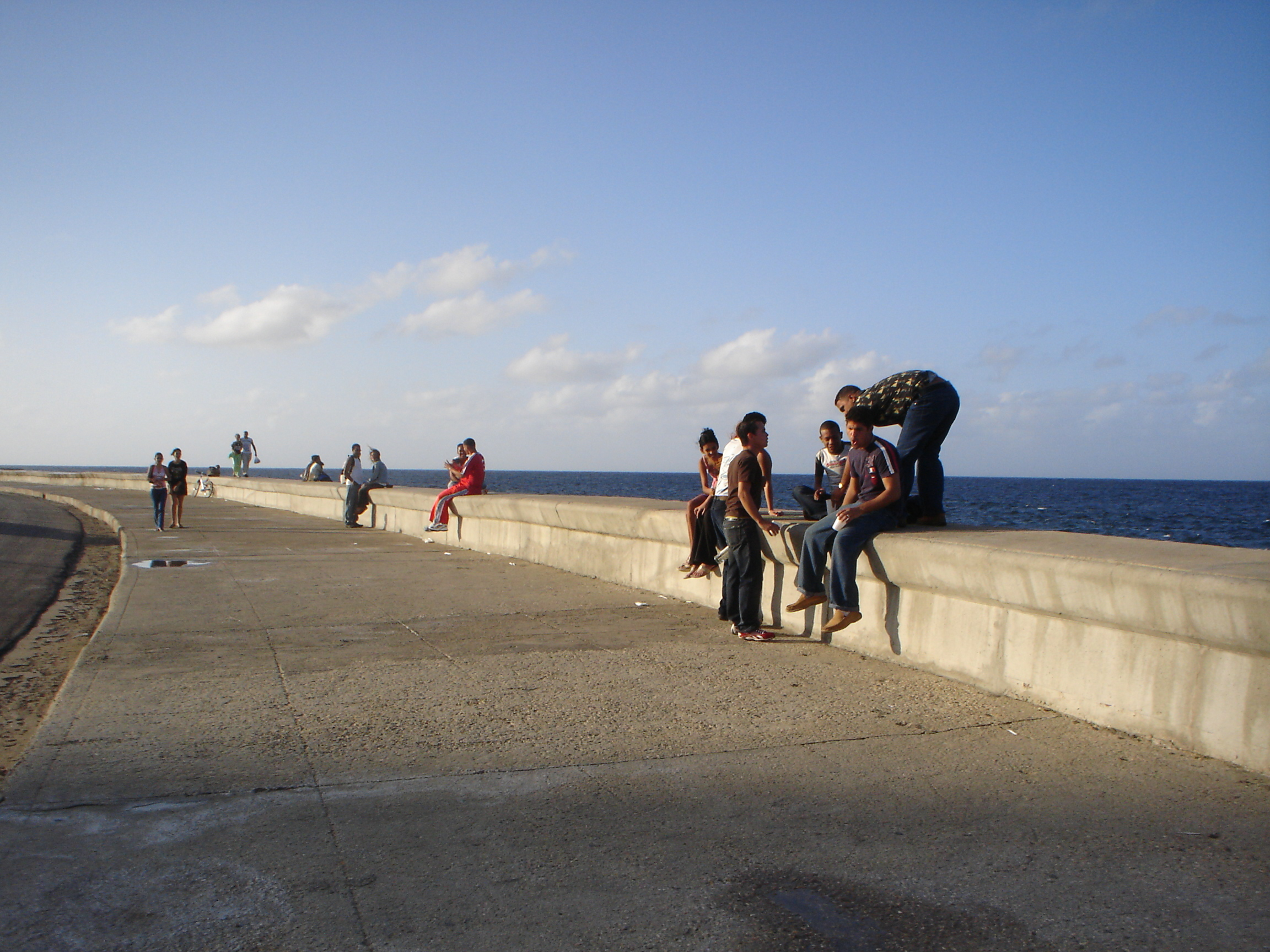
People socializing and walking at the Malecón, Havana

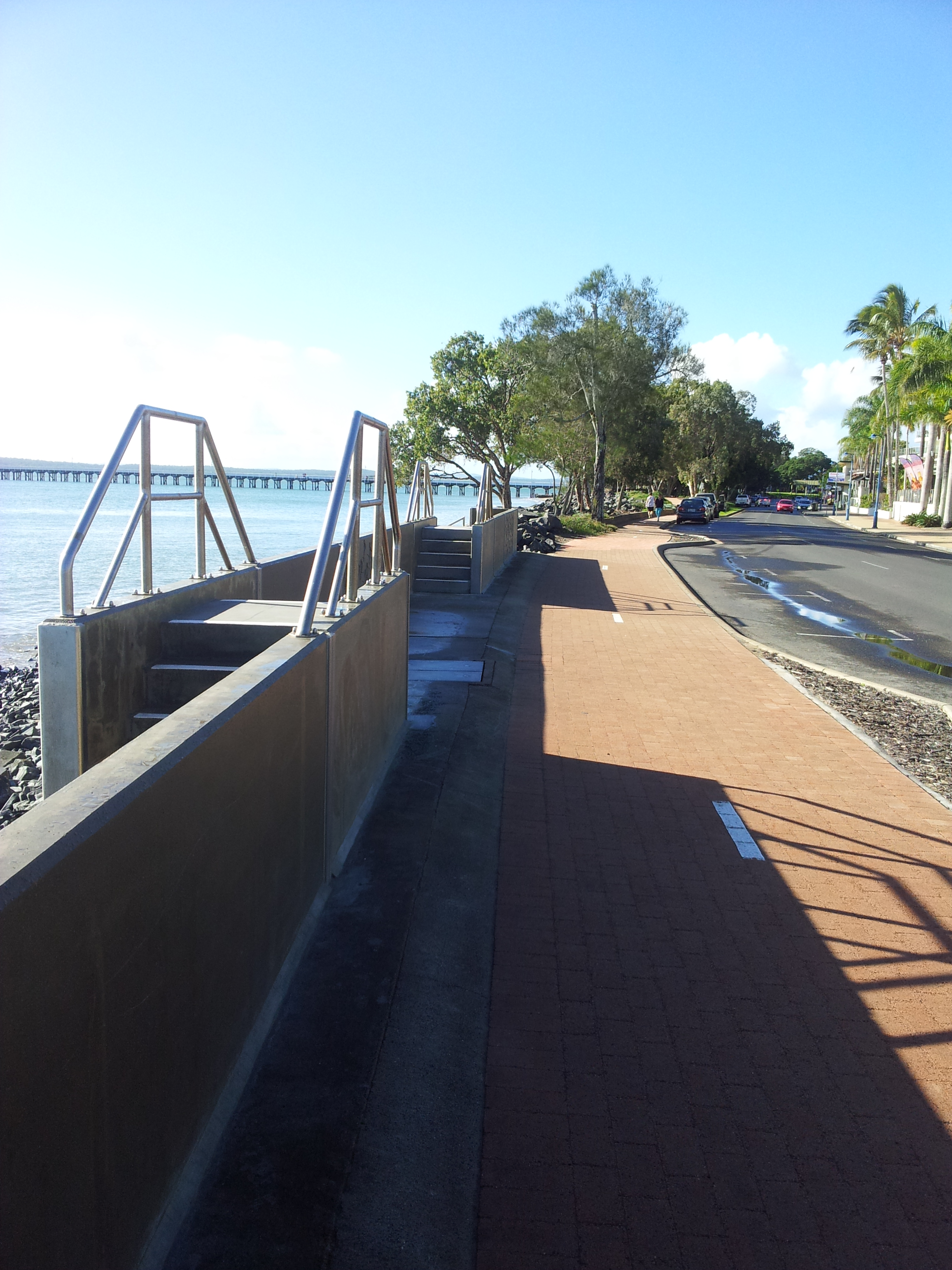
Seawall at Urangan, Queensland

A seawall (or sea wall) is a form of coastal defense constructed where the sea, and associated coastal processes, impact directly upon the landforms of the coast. The purpose of a seawall is to protect areas of human habitation, conservation, and leisure activities from the action of tides, waves, or tsunamis. As a seawall is a static feature, it will conflict with the dynamic nature of the coast and impede the exchange of sediment between land and sea.

Seawall design factors in local climate, coastal position, wave regime (determined by wave characteristics and effectors), and value (morphological characteristics) of landform. Seawalls are hard engineering shore-based structures that protect the coast from erosion. Various environmental issues may arise from the construction of a seawall, including the disruption of sediment movement and transport patterns. Combined with a high construction cost, this has led to increasing use of other soft engineering coastal management options such as beach replenishment.

Seawalls are constructed from various materials, most commonly reinforced concrete, boulders, steel, or gabions. Other possible construction materials include vinyl, wood, aluminum, fiberglass composite, and biodegradable sandbags made of jute and coir. In the UK, seawall also refers to an earthen bank used to create a polder, or a dike construction. The type of material used for construction is hypothesized to affect the settlement of coastal organisms, although the precise mechanism has yet to be identified.

== Types ==
A seawall works by reflecting incident wave energy back into the sea, thus reducing the energy available to cause erosion. Seawalls have two specific weaknesses. Wave reflection from the wall may result in hydrodynamic scour and subsequent lowering of the sand level of the fronting beach. Seawalls may also accelerate the erosion of adjacent, unprotected coastal areas by affecting the littoral drift process.

Different designs of man-made tsunami barriers include building reefs and forests to above-ground and submerged seawalls. Starting just weeks after the disaster, in January 2005, India began planting Casuarina and coconut saplings on its coast as a natural barrier against future disasters like the 2004 Indian Ocean earthquake. Studies have found that an offshore tsunami wall could reduce tsunami wave heights by up to 83%.

The appropriate seawall design relies on location-specific aspects, including surrounding erosion processes. There are three main types of seawalls: vertical, curved or stepped, and mounds (see table below).

Seawall types
Type	Illustration	Advantages	Disadvantages	Example
Vertical	Vertical seawalls are built in particularly exposed situations. These reflect wave energy. Under storm conditions a non-breaking standing wave pattern can form, resulting in a stationary clapotic wave which moves up and down but does not travel horizontally. These waves promote erosion at the toe of the wall and can cause severe damage to the seawall. In some cases, piles are placed in front of the wall to lessen wave energy slightly.			
Vertical		The first implemented, most easily designed and constructed type of seawall.; Vertical seawalls deflect wave energy away from the coast.; Loose rubble can absorb wave energy.	These can suffer a lot of expensive damage in a short period of time.; Vertical design can be undercut by high-wave energy environments over a long period of time.	
Curved	Curved or stepped seawalls are designed to enable waves to break to dissipate wave energy and to repel waves back to the sea. The curve can also prevent the wave overtopping the wall and provides additional protection for the toe of the wall.			
Curved		Concave structure introduces a dissipative element.; The curve can prevent waves from overtopping the wall and provides extra protection for the toe of the wall; Curved seawalls aim to re-direct most of the incident energy, resulting in low reflected waves and much reduced turbulence.	More complex engineering and design process.; The deflected waves can scour material at the base of the wall causing them to become undermined.	
Mound	Mound type seawalls, using revetments or riprap, are used in less demanding settings where lower energy erosional processes operate. The least exposed sites involve the lowest-cost bulkheads and revetments of sand bags or geotextiles. These serve to armour the shore and minimise erosion and may be either watertight or porous, which allows water to filter through after the wave energy has been dissipated.			
Mound		Current designs use porous designs of rock, concrete armour.; Slope and loose material ensure maximum dissipation of wave energy.; Lower cost option.	Shorter life expectancy.; Cannot withstand or protect from high-energy conditions effectively.	

=== Natural barriers ===
A report published by the United Nations Environment Programme (UNEP) suggests that the tsunami of 26 December 2004 caused less damage in the areas where natural barriers were present, such as mangroves, coral reefs or coastal vegetation. A Japanese study of this tsunami in Sri Lanka used satellite imagery modelling to establish the parameters of coastal resistance as a function of different types of trees. Natural barriers, such as coral reefs and mangrove forests, prevent the spread of tsunamis and the flow of coastal waters and mitigated the flood and surge of water.

== Trade-offs ==
A cost-benefit approach is an effective way to determine whether a seawall is appropriate and whether the benefits are worth the expense. Besides controlling erosion, consideration must be given to the effects of hardening a shoreline on natural coastal ecosystems and human property or activities. A seawall is a static feature which can conflict with the dynamic nature of the coast and impede the exchange of sediment between land and sea. The table below summarizes some positive and negative effects of seawalls which can be used when comparing their effectiveness with other coastal management options, such as beach nourishment.

Advantages and disadvantages of seawalls according to Short (1999)
Advantages	Disadvantages
Long term solution in comparison to soft beach nourishment.; Effectively minimizes loss of life in extreme events and damage to property caused by erosion.; Can exist longer in high energy environments in comparison to 'soft' engineering methods.; Can be used for recreation and sightseeing.; Forms a hard and strong coastal defense.	Expensive to construct.; May be considered aesthetically unattractive.; Reflected energy of waves leading to scour at base.; Can disrupt natural shoreline processes and destroy shoreline habitats such as wetlands and intertidal beaches.; Altered sediment transport processes can disrupt sand movement that can lead to increased erosion down drift from the structure. This can cause beaches to dissipate, rendering them useless for beach goers.

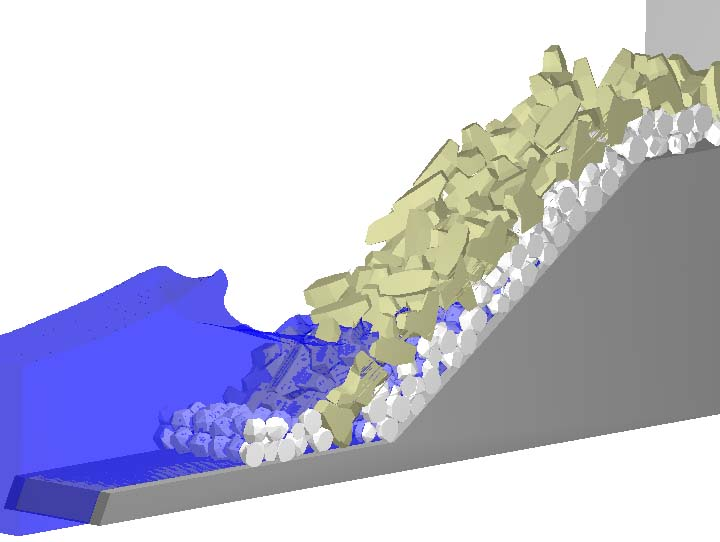
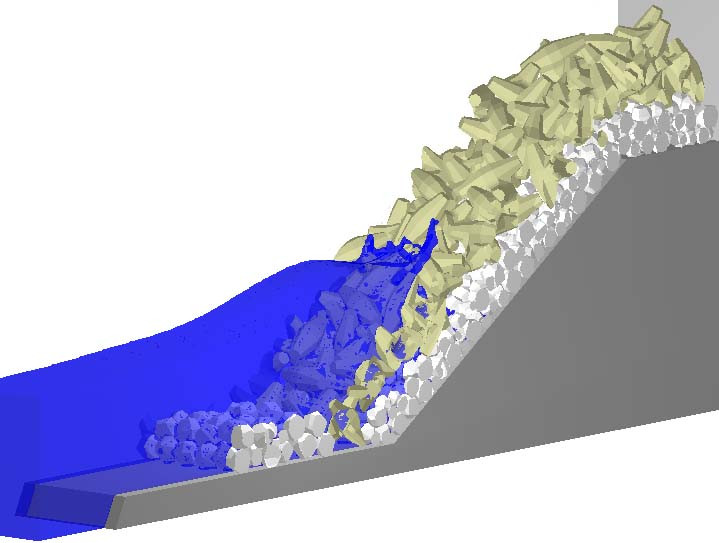
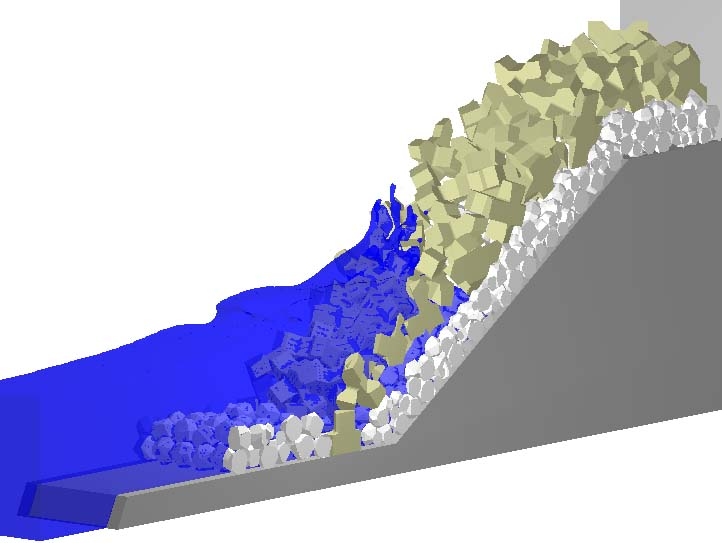
3D simulation of wave motion near a seawall.

Generally, seawalls can be a successful way to control coastal erosion, but only if they are constructed well and out of materials that can withstand the force of ongoing wave energy. Some understanding is needed of the coastal processes and morphodynamics specific to the seawall location. Seawalls can be very helpful; they can offer a more long-term solution than soft engineering options, additionally providing recreation opportunities and protection from extreme events as well as everyday erosion. Extreme natural events expose weaknesses in the performance of seawalls, and analyses of these can lead to future improvements and reassessment.

== Issues ==
=== Sea level rise ===
Sea level rise creates an issue for seawalls worldwide as it raises both the mean normal water level and the height of waves during extreme weather events, with which the current seawall heights may be unable to cope. The most recent analyses of long, good-quality tide gauge records (corrected for GIA and when possible for other vertical land motions by the Global Positioning System, GPS) indicate a mean rate of sea level rise of 1.6–1.8 mm/yr over the twentieth century. The Intergovernmental Panel on Climate Change (IPCC) (1997) suggested that sea level rise over the next 50 – 100 years will accelerate with a projected increase in global mean sea level of +18 cm by 2050 AD. This data is reinforced by Hannah (1990) who calculated similar statistics including a rise of between +16-19.3 cm throughout 1900–1988. Superstorm Sandy of 2012 is an example of the devastating effects rising sea levels can cause when mixed with a perfect storm. Superstorm Sandy sent a storm surge of 4–5 m onto New Jersey's and New York's barrier island and urban shorelines, estimated at $70 billion in damage. This problem could be overcome by further modeling and determining the extension of height and reinforcement of current seawalls which needs to occur for safety to be ensured in both situations. Sea level rise also will cause a higher risk of flooding and taller tsunamis.

=== Hydrostatic water pressure ===
Seawalls, like all retaining walls, must relieve the buildup of water pressure. Water pressure buildup is caused when groundwater is not drained from behind the seawall. Groundwater against a seawall can be from the area's natural water-table, rain percolating into the ground behind the wall and waves overtopping the wall. The water table can also rise during periods of high water (high tide). Lack of adequate drainage can cause the seawall to buckle, move, bow, crack, or collapse. Sinkholes may also develop as the escaping water pressure erodes soil through or around the drainage system.

=== Extreme events ===
Extreme events also pose a problem as it is not easy for people to predict or imagine the strength of hurricane or storm-induced waves compared to normal, expected wave patterns. An extreme event can dissipate hundreds of times more energy than everyday waves, and calculating structures that will stand the force of coastal storms is difficult and, often the outcome can become unaffordable. For example, the Omaha Beach seawall in New Zealand was designed to prevent erosion from everyday waves only, and when a storm in 1976 carved out ten meters behind the existing seawall, the whole structure was destroyed.

=== Ecosystem impacts ===
The addition of seawalls near marine ecosystems can lead to increased shadowing effects in the waters surrounding the seawall. Shadowing reduces the light and visibility within the water, which may disrupt the distribution as well as foraging capabilities of certain species. The sediment surrounding seawalls tends to have less favorable physical properties (Higher calcification levels, less structural organization of crystalline structure, low silicon content, and less macroscale roughness) when compared to natural shorelines, which can present issues for species that reside on the seafloor.

The Living Seawalls project, which was launched in Sydney, Australia, in 2018, aims to help many of the marine species in Sydney Harbour to flourish, thus enhancing its biodiversity, by modifying the design of its seawalls. It entails covering parts of the seawalls with specially designed tiles that mimic natural microhabitats – with crevices and other features that more closely resemble natural rocks. In September 2021, the Living Seawalls project was announced as a finalist for the international environment award the Earthshot Prize. Since 2022 it has become part of Project Restore, under the auspices of the Sydney Institute of Marine Science.

=== Other issues ===
Some further issues include a lack of long-term trend data of seawall effects due to a relatively short duration of data records; modeling limitations and comparisons of different projects and their effects being invalid or unequal due to different beach types; materials; currents; and environments. Lack of maintenance is also a major issue with seawalls. In 2013, more than 5,000 feet (1,500 m) of seawall was found to be crumbling in Punta Gorda, Florida. Residents of the area pay hundreds of dollars each year for a seawall repair program. The problem is that most of the seawalls are over a half-century old and are being destroyed by only heavy downpours. If not kept in check, seawalls lose effectiveness and become expensive to repair.

== History and examples ==
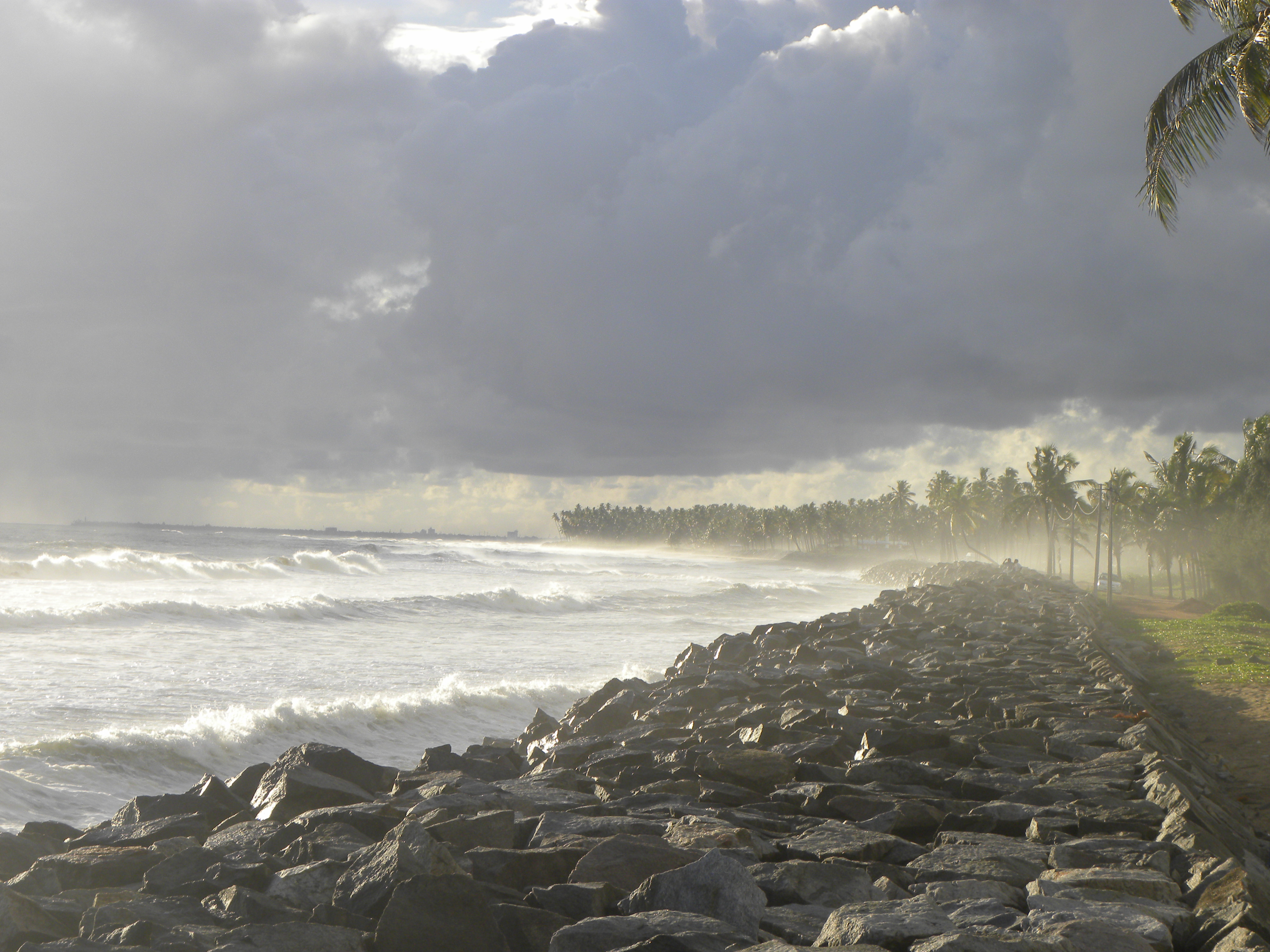
A seawall, made of rocks in Paravur near Kollam city in India.

Seawall construction has existed since ancient times. In the first century BCE, Romans built a seawall or breakwater at Caesarea Maritima creating an artificial harbor (Sebastos Harbor). The construction used Pozzolana concrete which hardens in contact with seawater. Barges were constructed and filled with the concrete. They were floated into position and sunk. The resulting harbor/breakwater/seawall is still in existence today – more than 2000 years later.

The oldest known coastal defense is believed to be a 100-meter row of boulders in the Mediterranean Sea off the coast of Israel. Boulders were positioned in an attempt to protect the coastal settlement of Tel Hreiz from sea rise following the last glacial maximum. Tel Hreiz was discovered in 1960 by divers searching for shipwrecks, but the row of boulders was not found until storms cleared a sand cover in 2012.

More recently, seawalls were constructed in 1623 in Canvey Island, UK, when great floods of the Thames estuary occurred, prompting the construction of protection for further events in this flood-prone area. Since then, seawall design has become more complex and intricate in response to an improvement in materials, technology, and an understanding of how coastal processes operate. This section will outline some key case studies of seawalls in chronological order and describe how they have performed in response to tsunamis or ongoing natural processes and how effective they were in these situations. Analyzing the successes and shortcomings of seawalls during severe natural events allows their weaknesses to be exposed, and areas become visible for future improvement.

=== Canada ===
The Vancouver Seawall is a stone seawall constructed around the perimeter of Stanley Park in Vancouver, British Columbia. The seawall was constructed initially as waves created by ships passing through the First Narrows eroding the area between Prospect Point and Brockton Point. Construction of the seawall began in 1917, and since then this pathway has become one of the most used features of the park by both locals and tourists and now extends 22 km in total. The construction of the seawall also provided employment for relief workers during the Great Depression and seamen from HMCS Discovery on Deadman's Island who were facing punishment detail in the 1950s (Steele, 1985).

Overall, the Vancouver Seawall is a prime example of how seawalls can simultaneously provide shoreline protection and a source of recreation which enhances human enjoyment of the coastal environment. It also illustrates that although shoreline erosion is a natural process, human activities, interactions with the coast, and poorly planned shoreline development projects can accelerate natural erosion rates.

=== India ===
On December 26, 2004, towering waves of the 2004 Indian Ocean earthquake tsunami crashed against India's south-eastern coastline killing thousands. However, the former French colonial enclave of Pondicherry escaped unscathed. This was primarily due to French engineers who had constructed (and maintained) a massive stone seawall during the time when the city was a French colony. This 300-year-old seawall effectively kept Pondicherry's historic center dry even though tsunami waves drove water 24 ft (7.3 m) above the normal high-tide mark.

The barrier was initially completed in 1735 and over the years, the French continued to fortify the wall, piling huge boulders along its 1.25 mi (2 km) coastline to stop erosion from the waves pounding the harbor. At its highest, the barrier running along the water's edge reaches about 27 ft (8.2 m) above sea level. The boulders, some weighing up to a ton, are weathered black and brown. The seawall is inspected every year and whenever gaps appear or the stones sink into the sand, the government adds more boulders to keep it strong.

The Union Territory of Pondicherry recorded around 600 deaths from the huge tsunami waves that struck India's coast after the mammoth underwater earthquake (which measured 9.0 on the moment magnitude scale) off Indonesia, but most of those killed were fishermen who lived in villages beyond the artificial barrier which reinforces the effectiveness of seawalls.

=== Japan ===
At least 43 percent of Japan's 29,751 km (18,486 mi) coastline is lined with concrete seawalls or other structures designed to protect the country against high waves, typhoons, or even tsunamis. During the 2011 Tōhoku earthquake and tsunami, the seawalls in most areas were overwhelmed. In Kamaishi, 4-metre (13 ft) waves surmounted the seawall – the world's largest, erected a few years ago in the city's harbor at a depth of 63 m (207 ft), a length of 2 km (1.2 mi) and a cost of $1.5 billion – and eventually submerged the city center.

The risks of dependence on seawalls were most evident in the crisis at the Fukushima Dai-ichi and Fukushima Dai-ni nuclear power plants, both located along the coast close to the earthquake zone, as the tsunami washed over walls that were supposed to protect the plants. Arguably, the additional defense provided by the seawalls presented an extra margin of time for citizens to evacuate and also stopped some of the full force of energy which would have caused the wave to climb higher in the backs of coastal valleys. In contrast, the seawalls also acted in a negative way to trap water and delay its retreat.

The failure of the world's largest seawall, which cost $1.5 billion to construct, shows that building stronger seawalls to protect larger areas would have been even less cost-effective. In the case of the ongoing crisis at the nuclear power plants, higher and stronger seawalls should have been built if power plants were to be built at that site. Fundamentally, the devastation in coastal areas and a final death toll predicted to exceed 10,000 could push Japan to redesign its seawalls or consider more effective alternative methods of coastal protection for extreme events. Such hardened coastlines can also provide a false sense of security to property owners and local residents as evident in this situation.

Seawalls along the Japanese coast have also been criticized for cutting settlements off from the sea, making beaches unusable, presenting an eyesore, disturbing wildlife, and being unnecessary.

=== United States ===
After 2012's Hurricane Sandy, New York City Mayor Bill de Blasio invested $3,000,000,000 in a hurricane restoration fund, with part of the money dedicated to building new seawalls and protection from future hurricanes. A New York Harbor Storm-Surge Barrier has been proposed, but not voted on or funded by Congress or the State of New York.

In Florida, tiger dams are used to protect homes near the coast.

== See also ==
- Breakwater (structure)
- Mole (architecture)

General:

- Coastal management – Preventing flooding and erosion of shorelines
- Hard engineering – Construction of hydraulic structures to reduce coastal erosion

Related types of walls:

- Accropode – Concrete breakwater element
- Breakwater (structure) – Coastal defense structure
- Dike (construction) – Ridge or wall to hold back water
- Levee – Ridge or wall to hold back water
- Retaining wall – Artificial wall used for supporting soil between two different elevations

Specific walls:

- Alaskan Way Seawall – Seawall in Seattle, Washington
- Galveston Seawall
- Georgetown Seawall – 280-mile wall in Guyana
- Gold Coast Seawall
- Saemangeum Seawall – World's longest man-made dyke
- Sea Bright–Monmouth Beach Seawall – Seawall in New Jersey
- The Embarcadero (San Francisco) – Waterfront and street on San Francisco Bay
- Walls of Constantinople#Sea Walls – City walls of Constantinople (modern Istanbul, Turkey) (Constantinople seawalls)
