= Hydraulic structure =

A hydraulic structure is a structure submerged or partially submerged in any body of water, which disrupts the natural flow of water. It can be used to divert, disrupt or completely stop the flow. An example of a hydraulic structure would be a dam, which slows the normal flow rate of the river in order to power turbines. A hydraulic structure can be built in rivers, a sea, or any body of water where there is a need for a change in the natural flow of water.

Hydraulic structures may also be used to measure the flow of water. When used to measure the flow of water, hydraulic structures are defined as a class of specially shaped, static devices over or through which water is directed in such a way that under free-flow conditions at a specified location (point of measurement) a known level to flow relationship exists. Hydraulic structures of this type can generally be divided into two categories: flumes and weirs.

== See also ==
- Hard engineering
