= Dutch sand ladder =

Type of rope ladder

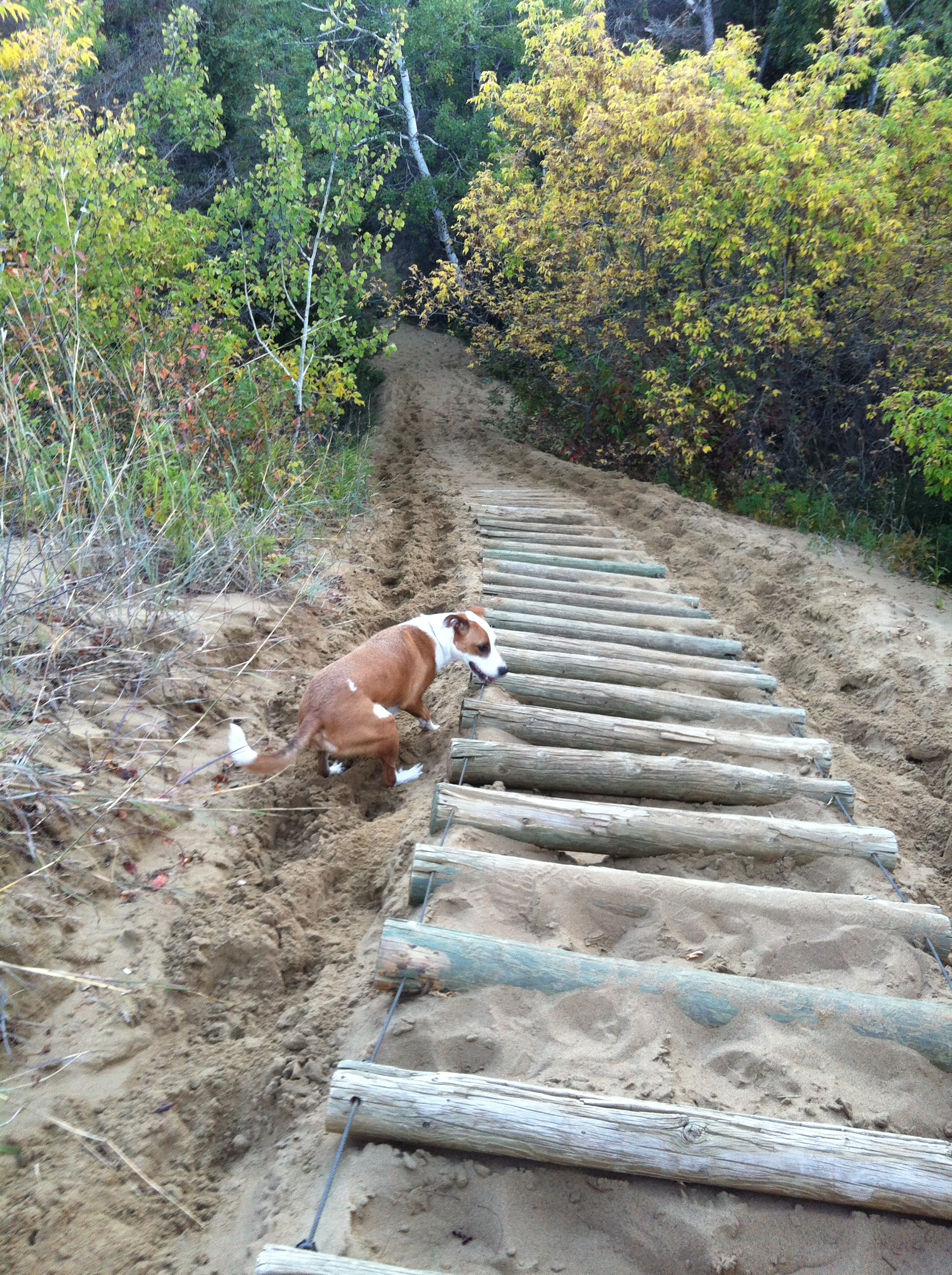
A wooden sand ladder installed to help hikers climb a sand dune in Spruce Woods Provincial Park, Manitoba

A Dutch sand ladder is a cable or rope ladder with rungs usually made of wood, lying on a sandy slope to allow persons to ascend or descend with minimal erosion. The bottom end is anchored and the top end is designed for easy disconnection so that the ladder can be lifted up to shake loose any sand that has accumulated on the rungs. The ability to be easily maintained and reset makes sand ladders useful trail features for steep sand dunes or other easily eroded areas where permanent structures are infeasible or impractical.
