= Hard engineering =

Construction of hydraulic structures to reduce coastal erosion

Hard engineering involves the construction of hydraulic structures to protect coasts from erosion. Such structures include seawalls, gabions, breakwaters, groynes and tetrapods.

== Effects ==
Hard engineering can cause unintended environmental consequences, such as new erosion and altered sedimentation patterns, that are detrimental to the immediate human and natural environment or along down-coast locations and habitats.

Seawalls and bulkheads may have multiple negative effects on nearshore ecosystems due to the way they reflect wave energy instead of dissipating it. Energy from reflected waves can cause a scouring effect on substrate below the structure, resulting in loss or displacement of sediment. Over time, this effect may lead to a decrease in the size of intertidal and nearshore habitats. This effect is also known as coastal squeeze. In addition, bulkheads and seawalls offer no filtering for surface runoff, this means that anthropogenic pollutants and chemicals in armored areas may enter coastal waters relatively quickly.

Hard engineering, also called shoreline armoring, comes with other ecological effects on top of habitat loss and increased surface runoff. Structures that are built between land and sea are usually made of material not native to shoreline ecosystems. For instance, most sea walls and interlocking coastal defense structures are made of concrete, which may lend itself as habitat for invasive species rather than native ones. These structures also impede shoreline access, blocking some or all species from accessing refuge on dry land. In these armored areas, nutrient exchange between tidal and riparian ecosystems is threatened or cut off entirely. These issues arise from hard engineered sea shores, and lead many to believe that living shoreline techniques are far more beneficial ecologically and in terms of long-term erosion control.

== Examples ==
Examples of hard engineering include:

- Groynes – Low walls constructed at right angles to retain sediments that might otherwise be removed due to longshore drift. These structures absorb or reduce the energy of the waves and cause materials to be deposited on the updrift side of the groyne facing the longshore drift.
- Seawalls – Seawalls are constructed to protect coastlines against wave attack by absorbing wave energy. Most seawalls are made out of concrete or stone and are built parallel to the coast. They have been constructed in thousands of locations throughout the world.
- Rip-rap/rock armour – Boulders piled up against the coast that absorb the energy of the waves
- Gabions – wire cages filled with rocks to absorb wave energy
