= Gozdów =

Gozdów may refer to the following places:

- Gozdów, Koło County in Greater Poland Voivodeship (central Poland)
- Gozdów, Łódź Voivodeship (central Poland)
- Gozdów, Lublin Voivodeship (east Poland)
- Gozdów, Turek County in Greater Poland Voivodeship (central Poland)
