= Dryja =

Dryja is a surname. Notable people with the surname include:

- Dawid Dryja (born 1992), volleyball player
- Thaddeus Dryja, American ophthalmologist and geneticist

== See also ==
- Dryja, Greater Poland Voivodeship, village in west-central Poland
- Dryja coat of arms
