= Krystian Pilarczyk =

Polish/Dutch Hydraulic Engineer

Krystian W. Pilarczyk
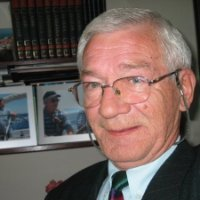
- Krystian Pilarczyk, photo c. 1995
- Born: 14 February 1941 (age 85); Ogorzelczyn, Poland
- Education: Gdańsk University of Technology
- Known for: Delta Works
- Scientific career
- Fields: Civil Engineering; Hydraulic Engineering
- Workplaces: Instytut Budownictwa Wodnego-Polskiej Akademii Nauk Gdańsk; Waterloopkundig Laboratorium; Rijkswaterstaat
- Thesis: (1964)

Krystian Walenty Pilarczyk (born 14 February 1941) is a hydraulic engineer whose contributions to civil and hydraulic engineering include the development and improvement of the Izbash formula, along with the Pilarczyk formula for the stability of block revetments. He is the author and editor of a number of academic papers and textbooks on coastal, river, and hydraulic engineering subjects.

Between 1971 and 1978, Pilarczyk was involved in the design of the Delta Works, where he was coordinator of applied research, undertaking work on the closure of tidal basins and on the static and dynamic stability of armourstone and riprap used in coastal and river engineering applications. He has acted as an advisor on coastal engineering projects to the World Bank and Asian Development Bank, as well as lecturing at the IHE Delft Institute for Water Education and Nanjing Hydraulic Research Institute.

== Education and early career ==
Pilarczyk was born in the village of Ogorzelczyn in west central Poland in 1941. He studied at the Technikum Żeglugi Śródlądowej (English: Technical School of Inland Waterways) in Wrocław, graduating in 1959. He then trained as a hydraulic engineer at Gdańsk University of Technology, where he completed a master's degree in Hydraulic and Coastal Engineering in 1964.

Upon graduation, he initially worked as a research engineer at the Instytut Budownictwa Wodnego (English: Institute of Hydro-Engineering) of the Polish Academy of Sciences in Gdańsk, before moving to the Netherlands where he worked as a research engineer at the Waterloopkundig Laboratorium in Delft from 1966 until 1968. He returned to the Institute of Hydro-Engineering from 1968 until 1971, when he again returned to the Netherlands to take up a position with Rijkswaterstaat. It was in this role, as research manager with Rijkswaterstaat's Deltadienst (English: Delta Service), that Pilarczyk had responsibility for the design of Delta Works projects.

== Role at Rijkswaterstaat ==
Upon joining Rijkswaterstaat, Pilarczyk was involved in the Delta Works until 1978, as a coordinator of applied research and designer. He initiated several major research programs, including studies on the static and dynamic stability of riprap and armourstone, the closure of tidal estuaries, prediction techniques for scour, and protective structures to prevent erosion. After the dissolution of the Delta Service towards the end of the Delta Works programme, he transferred to Rijkwswaterstaat's Dienst Weg- en Waterbouwkunde (DWW, English: Roads and Hydraulic Engineering Department).

During his time at Rijkswaterstaat, Pilarczyk commenced a major research programme to investigate the effects of wave run-up and wave overtopping on the stability of dikes and other hydraulic structures with geotextiles. The results from this programme led to the incorporation of design formulas in international design guidelines such as the Rock Manual and the EurOtop Manual.

== International research and collaboration ==
From around 1985, Pilarczyk sought to strengthen ties between Rijkswaterstaat and other institutions in the Netherlands such as Delft University of Technology, with his former colleagues at the Hydroengineering Institute in Gdańsk. As a result of this collaboration, Rijkswaterstaat gained access to the results of much hydraulic engineering research from the Eastern Bloc countries which had previously been unavailable to international academia, and a significant amount of this material was then translated into English.

In 1996, Pilarczyk travelled to Vietnam to commence an inventory on the condition of the country's dikes. This led to ongoing collaboration between Rijkswaterstaat and the Vietnamese public works authorities, and the development of training courses for staff in Vietnam, as well as a comprehensive Vietnamese handbook for the design of coastal and river protection structures. A further development from the collaboration initiated by Pilarczyk was research cooperation between Delft University of Technology and Thuyloi University in a programme funded by both the Dutch and Vietnamese governments, which resulted in the creation of a coastal engineering faculty at Thuyloi, complete with a coastal engineering laboratory.

Pilarczyk also initiated collaboration with the Instituto Superior Politécnico Jose Antonio Echevarria in Cuba. As a result of this, several Dutch hydraulic engineering design guides and textbooks were translated into Spanish.

== Later career and retirement ==
Pilarczyk retired on 1 December 2004, but continued to work on a contract basis for Rijkswaterstaat, and also advised the World Bank and Asian Development Bank. He authored and edited several papers and books on coastal and hydraulic engineering, and worked part-time as a lecturer at the IHE Delft Institute for Water Education in Delft and at the Nanjing Hydraulic Research Institute. In December 2002, he was appointed Honorary Professor of the Nanjing Hydraulic Research Institute.

== Selected bibliography ==
- Manthey, Tadeusz; Pilarczyk, Krystian W. (1965). Badania zwężeń przelewu stopnia w kanale trapezowym [Investigation of weir narrowing in a trapezoidal channel] (in Polish). Gdańsk. Tp704.
- Pilarczyk, Krystian W. (1966). Rozwiązywanie zagadnień hydraulicznych dla kanałów wykładniczych i trapezowych [Solving hydraulic problems for exponential and trapezoidal channels] (in Polish). Gdańsk. Tp755.
- Pilarczyk, Krystian W. (1966). Zastosowanie graficznych metod rozwiązywania kanałów trapezowych [Application of graphical methods for solving trapezoidal channels] (in Polish). Gdańsk. Tp756.
- Pilarczyk, Krystian W. (1968). Sprawozdanie z pobytu w Laboratorium Hydraulicznym w Delft 7.11.1966-15.6.1968 [Report on the stay at the Hydraulic Laboratory in Delft from 7 November 1966, to 15 June 1968] (in Polish). Gdańsk. Tp902.
- Nobis, Władysław; Pilarczyk, Krystian W. (1970). Badania warunków przepływu w korycie zwężonym grodzą [Investigation of flow conditions in a channel narrowed by a groyne] (in Polish). Gdańsk. Tp1025.
- Manthey, Tadeusz; Pilarczyk, Krystian W. (1970). Hydrauliczne badania modelowe systemów napełniania i opróźniania śluzy żeglugowe "Czersk Polski" [Hydraulic model studies of the filling and emptying systems of the "Czersk Polski" navigation lock] (in Polish). Gdańsk. Tp1027.
- Pilarczyk, Krystian W. (1970). Superkawitacja. XIII Kongres IAHR, 1969 Kyoto-Japonia [Supercavitation. XIII IAHR Congress, 1969 Kyoto-Japan] (in Polish). Gdańsk. Tp1033.
- Manthey, Tadeusz; Pilarczyk, Krystian W. (1972). Model Investigation of Flow and Local Scour Downstream from a Drop Structures. Gdańsk. Tp1259.
- van der Meer, J.W.; Pilarczyk, Krystian W. (1984). Stability of rubble mound slopes under random wave attack. Delft. III23216.
- Pilarczyk, Krystian W. (1990). Coastal Protection. Rotterdam: Balkema. p. 550. ISBN 9789061911272.
- Pilarczyk, Krystian W., ed. (1994). Design plan of the Oosterschelde storm-surge barrier: Overall design and design philosophy. Rotterdam: A.A. Balkema. ISBN 90-5410-107-5.
- Pilarczyk, Krystian W. (1994). Novel systems in coastal engineering: geotextile systems and other methods. Delft. III23206.
- Pilarczyk, Krystian W.; Przedwojski, B.; Błażejewski, R. (1995). River training techniques: fundamentals, design, and applications. Rotterdam: Balkema. p. 686. ISBN 9054101962.
- Pilarczyk, Krystian W.; Zeidler, R.B. (1996). Offshore breakwaters and shore evolution control. Rotterdam: Balkema. p. 560. ISBN 9054106271.
- Pilarczyk, Krystian W., ed. (1998). Dikes and revetments: design, maintenance, and safety assessment. Rotterdam: Balkema. p. 562. ISBN 9054104554.
- Pilarczyk, Krystian W. (2000). Geosynthetics and geosystems. Rotterdam: Balkema. p. 913. ISBN 9058093026.

== See also ==
- Delta Works
- Rijkswaterstaat
