= Babiak =

Babiak may refer to:

== Places ==
- Babiak, Koło County in Greater Poland Voivodeship (central Poland)
- Babiak, Turek County in Greater Poland Voivodeship (central Poland)
- Babiak, Warmian-Masurian Voivodeship (north Poland)

== People with the surname ==
- Miron Babiak (1932–2013), Polish sailor
- Todd Babiak, Canadian writer
