= Frąckowiak =

Frąckowiak is a Polish-language surname. It is a patronymic surname of Northern Poland origin formed by the addition of the diminutive suffix "-ak" to father's surname "Frąckow".

Notable people with this surname include:

- Elżbieta Frąckowiak, Polish electrochemical engineer
- Grzegorz Bolesław Frąckowiak (1911–1943), Society of the Divine Word martyr
- Halina Frąckowiak, Polish singer, songwriter, and composer <-- Notability: multiple state decorations and numerous awards-->>
- Magdalena Frąckowiak (born 1984), Polish model and jewelry designer
- Marek Frąckowiak (1950–2017), Polish actor of stage and screen
- Richard Frackowiak (born 1950), British neurologist and neuroscientist
