= Deposition (geology) =

Natural addition of materials to a landmass

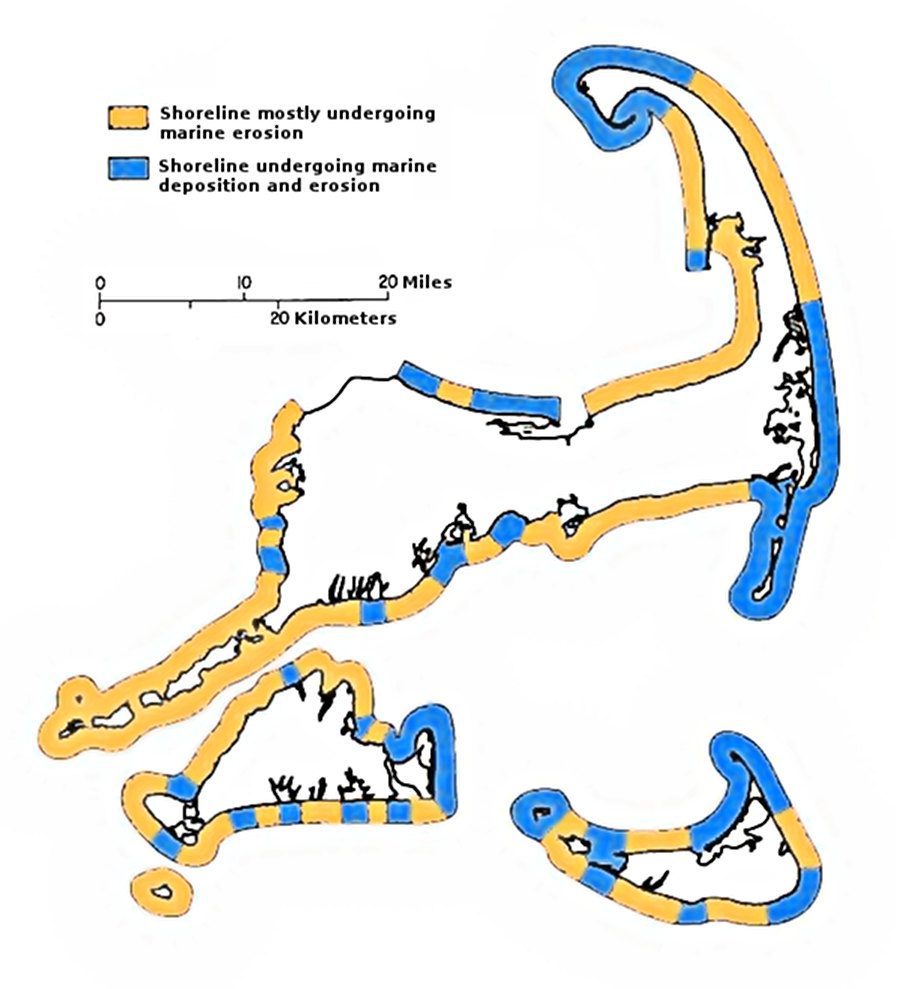
Map of Cape Cod showing shores undergoing erosion (cliffed sections) in yellow, and shores characterized by marine deposition (barriers) in blue.

Deposition is the geological process in which sediments, soil and rocks are added to a landform or landmass. Wind, ice, water, and gravity transport previously weathered surface material, which, at the loss of enough kinetic energy in the fluid, is deposited, building up layers of sediment.

This occurs when the forces responsible for sediment transportation are no longer sufficient to overcome the forces of gravity and friction, creating a resistance to motion; this is known as the null point hypothesis. Deposition can also refer to the buildup of sediment from organically derived matter or chemical processes. For example, chalk is made up partly of the microscopic calcium carbonate skeletons of marine plankton, the deposition of which induced chemical processes (diagenesis) to deposit further calcium carbonate. Similarly, the formation of coal begins with the deposition of organic material, mainly from plants, in anaerobic conditions.

== Null point hypothesis ==
The null point hypothesis explains how sediment is deposited throughout a shore profile according to its grain size. This is due to the influence of hydraulic energy, resulting in a seaward-fining of sediment particle size, or where fluid forcing equals gravity for each grain size. The concept can also be explained as "sediment of a particular size may move across the profile to a position where it is in equilibrium with the wave and flows acting on that sediment grain". This sorting mechanism combines the influence of the down-slope gravitational force of the profile and forces due to flow asymmetry; the position where there is zero net transport is known as the null point and was first proposed by Cornaglia in 1889. Figure 1 illustrates this relationship between sediment grain size and the depth of the marine environment.

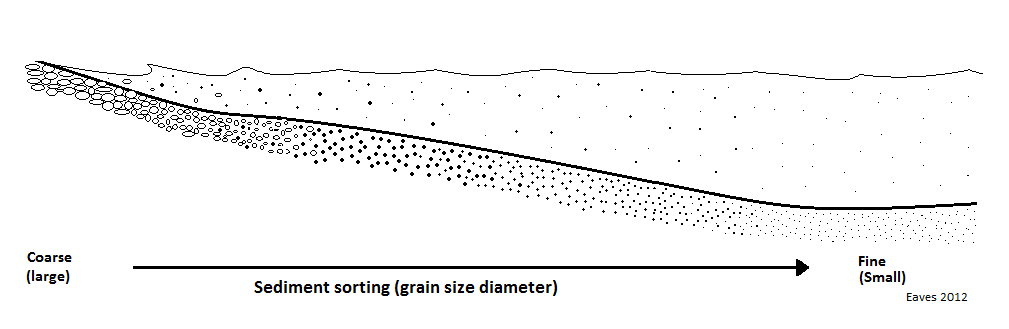
Figure 1. Illustrating the sediment size distribution over a shoreline profile, where finer sediments are transported away from high energy environments and settle out of suspension, or deposit in calmer environments. Coarse sediments are maintained in the upper shoreline profile and are sorted by the wave-generated hydraulic regime

The first principle underlying the null point theory is due to the gravitational force; finer sediments remain in the water column for longer durations allowing transportation outside the surf zone to deposit under calmer conditions. The gravitational effect or settling velocity determines the location of deposition for finer sediments, whereas a grain's internal angle of friction determines the deposition of larger grains on a shore profile. The secondary principle to the creation of seaward sediment fining is known as the hypothesis of asymmetrical thresholds under waves; this describes the interaction between the oscillatory flow of waves and tides flowing over the wave ripple bedforms in an asymmetric pattern. "The relatively strong onshore stroke of the waveforms an eddy or vortex on the lee side of the ripple, provided the onshore flow persists, this eddy remains trapped in the lee of the ripple. When the flow reverses, the eddy is thrown upwards off the bottom and a small cloud of suspended sediment generated by the eddy is ejected into the water column above the ripple, the sediment cloud is then moved seaward by the offshore stroke of the wave." Where there is symmetry in ripple shape the vortex is neutralised, the eddy and its associated sediment cloud develops on both sides of the ripple. This creates a cloudy water column which travels under the tidal influence as the wave orbital motion is in equilibrium.

The null point hypothesis has been quantitatively proven in Akaroa in New Zealand, It's Harbour(Akaroa Harbour). also in a multitude of other places including; The Wash, U.K., Bohai Bay and West Huang Sera, mainland China. In numerous other studies; Ippen and Eagleson (1955), Eagleson and Dean (1959, 1961) and Miller and Zeigler (1958, 1964).

=== Deposition of non-cohesive sediments ===
Large-grain sediments transported by either bedload or suspended load will come to rest when there is insufficient bed shear stress and fluid turbulence to keep the sediment moving; with the suspended load this can be some distance as the particles need to fall through the water column. This is determined by the grain's downward acting weight force being matched by a combined buoyancy and fluid drag force and can be expressed by:

$$\frac{4}{3} \pi R^3 \rho_s g = \frac{4}{3}  \pi R^3 \rho g  + \frac{1}{2} \Complex_d \rho \pi R^2 w_s^2\,$$

Downward acting weight force = Upward-acting buoyancy force + Upward-acting fluid drag force

where:

- π is the ratio of a circle's circumference to its diameter.
- R is the radius of the spherical object (in m),
- ρ is the mass density of the fluid (kg/m^{3}),
- g is the gravitational acceleration (m/s^{2}),
- C_{d} is the drag coefficient, and
- w_{s} is the particle's settling velocity (in m/s).

In order to calculate the drag coefficient, the grain's Reynolds number needs to be discovered, which is based on the type of fluid through which the sediment particle is flowing, laminar flow, turbulent flow or a hybrid of both. When the fluid becomes more viscous due to smaller grain sizes or larger settling velocities, the prediction is less straightforward and it is applicable to incorporate Stokes Law (also known as the frictional force, or drag force) of settling.

=== Deposition of cohesive sediments ===
The cohesion of sediment occurs with the small grain sizes associated with silts and clays, or particles smaller than 4ϕ on the phi scale. If these fine particles remain dispersed in the water column, Stokes law applies to the settling velocity of the individual grains, although due to seawater being a strong electrolyte bonding agent, flocculation occurs where individual particles create an electrical bond adhering each other together to form flocs. "The face of a clay platelet has a slight negative charge where the edge has a slight positive charge when two platelets come into close proximity with each other the face of one particle and the edge of the other are electrostatically attracted." Flocs then have a higher combined mass which leads to quicker deposition through a higher fall velocity, and deposition in a more shoreward direction than they would have as the individual fine grains of clay or silt.

=== The occurrence of null point theory ===
Akaroa Harbour is located on Banks Peninsula, Canterbury, New Zealand, 43°48′S 172°56′E. The formation of this harbour has occurred due to active erosional processes on an extinct shield volcano, whereby the sea has flooded the caldera, creating an inlet 16 km in length, with an average width of 2 km and a depth of −13 m relative to mean sea level at the 9 km point down the transect of the central axis. The predominant storm wave energy has unlimited fetch for the outer harbour from a southerly direction, with a calmer environment within the inner harbour, though localised harbour breezes create surface currents and chop influencing the marine sedimentation processes. Deposits of loess from subsequent glacial periods have in filled volcanic fissures over millennia, resulting in volcanic basalt and loess as the main sediment types available for deposition in Akaroa Harbour

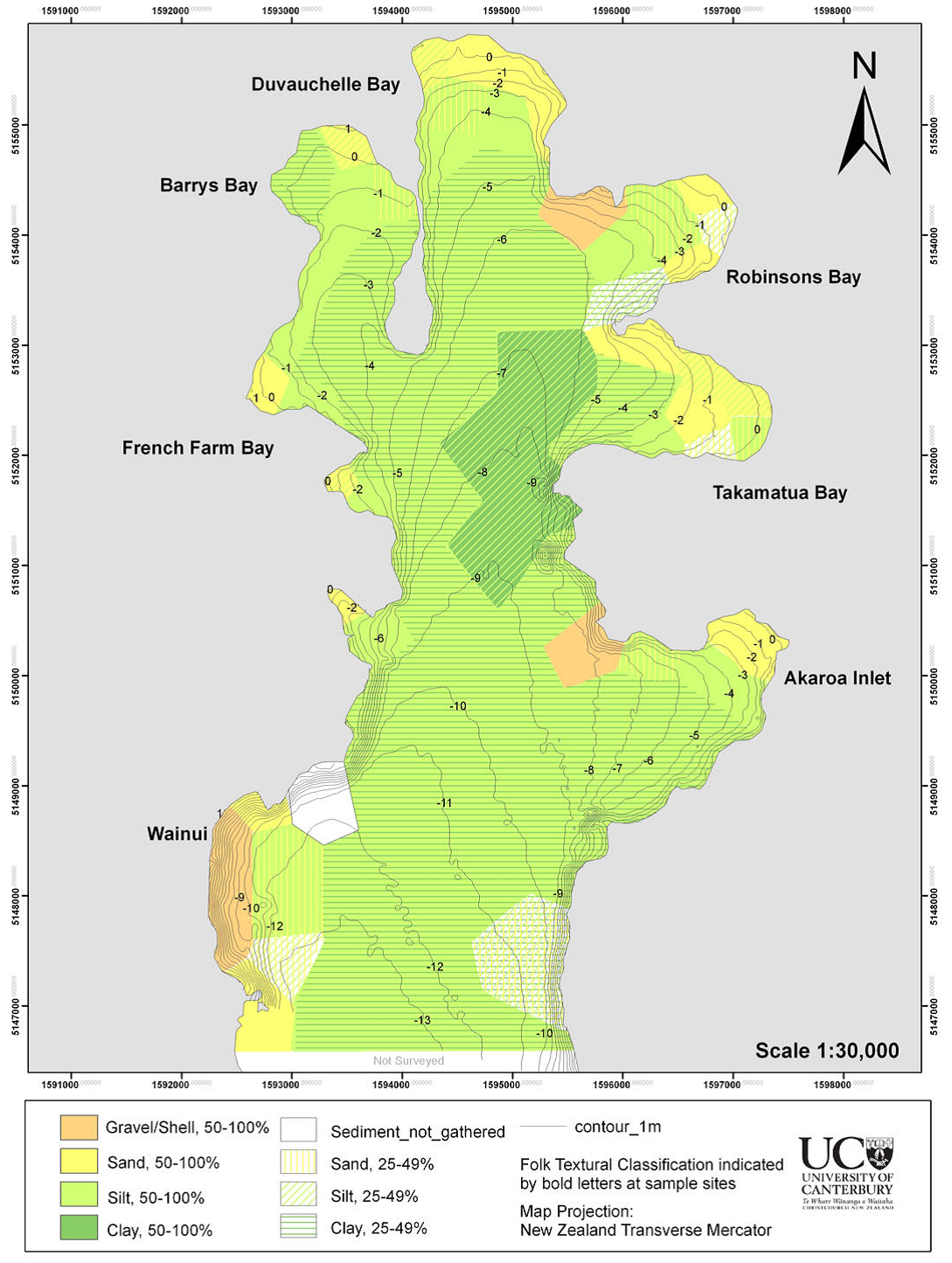
Figure 2. Map of Akaroa Harbour showing a fining of sediments with increased bathymetry toward the central axis of the harbour. Taken from Hart et al. (2009) and the University of Canterbury under the contract of Environment Canterbury.

Hart et al. (2009) discovered through bathymetric survey, sieve and pipette analysis of subtidal sediments, that sediment textures were related to three main factors: depth, distance from shoreline, and distance along the central axis of the harbour. This resulted in the fining of sediment textures with increasing depth and towards the central axis of the harbour, or if classified into grain class sizes, "the plotted transect for the central axis goes from silty sands in the intertidal zone to sandy silts in the inner nearshore, to silts in the outer reaches of the bays to mud at depths of 6 m or more". See figure 2 for detail.

Other studies have shown this process of the winnowing of sediment grain size from the effect of hydrodynamic forcing; Wang, Collins and Zhu (1988) qualitatively correlated increasing intensity of fluid forcing with increasing grain size. "This correlation was demonstrated at the low energy clayey tidal flats of Bohai Bay (China), the moderate environment of the Jiangsu coast (China) where the bottom material is silty, and the sandy flats of the high energy coast of The Wash (U.K.)." This research shows conclusive evidence for the null point theory existing on tidal flats with differing hydrodynamic energy levels and also on flats that are both erosional and accretional.

Kirby R. (2002) takes this concept further explaining that the fines are suspended and reworked aerially offshore leaving behind lag deposits of the main bivalve and gastropod shells separated out from the finer substrate beneath, waves and currents then heap these deposits to form chenier ridges throughout the tidal zone, which tend to be forced up the foreshore profile but also along the foreshore. Cheniers can be found at any level on the foreshore and predominantly characterise an erosion-dominated regime.

=== Applications for coastal planning and management ===
The null point theory has been controversial in its acceptance into mainstream coastal science as the theory operates in dynamic equilibrium or unstable equilibrium, and many fields and laboratory observations have failed to replicate the state of a null point at each grain size throughout the profile. The interaction of variables and processes over time within the environmental context causes issues; "a large number of variables, the complexity of the processes, and the difficulty in observation, all place serious obstacles in the way of systematisation, therefore in certain narrow fields the basic physical theory may be sound and reliable but the gaps are large"

Geomorphologists, engineers, governments and planners should be aware of the processes and outcomes involved with the null point hypothesis when performing tasks such as beach nourishment, issuing building consents or building coastal defence structures. This is because sediment grain size analysis throughout a profile allows inference into the erosion or accretion rates possible if shore dynamics are modified. Planners and managers should also be aware that the coastal environment is dynamic and contextual science should be evaluated before the implementation of any shore profile modification. Thus theoretical studies, laboratory experiments, numerical and hydraulic modelling seek to answer questions pertaining to littoral drift and sediment deposition, the results should not be viewed in isolation and a substantial body of purely qualitative observational data should supplement any planning or management decision.

== See also ==
- Cementation (geology) – Process of chemical precipitation bonding sedimentary grains
- Cross-bedding – Sedimentary rock strata at differing angles
- Drift (geology) – Material of glacial origin
- Flocculation – Particles coming out of suspension as flakes
- Longshore drift – Sediment moved by the longshore current
- Overbank – Alluvial geological deposit
- Sedimentary rock – Rock formed by the deposition and cementation of particles
- Sedimentary structures – Geologic structures formed during sediment deposition
- Settling – Process by which particulates move towards the bottom of a liquid and form a sediment
- Shields parameter – Dimensionless parameter in fluid mechanics
- Sorting - sediment sorting
- Stokes' law – Equation for the velocity of a body in viscous fluid
- Superficial deposits – Geological deposits
