= Jewish ghettos established by Nazi Germany =

Areas of Jewish imprisonment during the Holocaust

Ghettos in German-occupied Europe
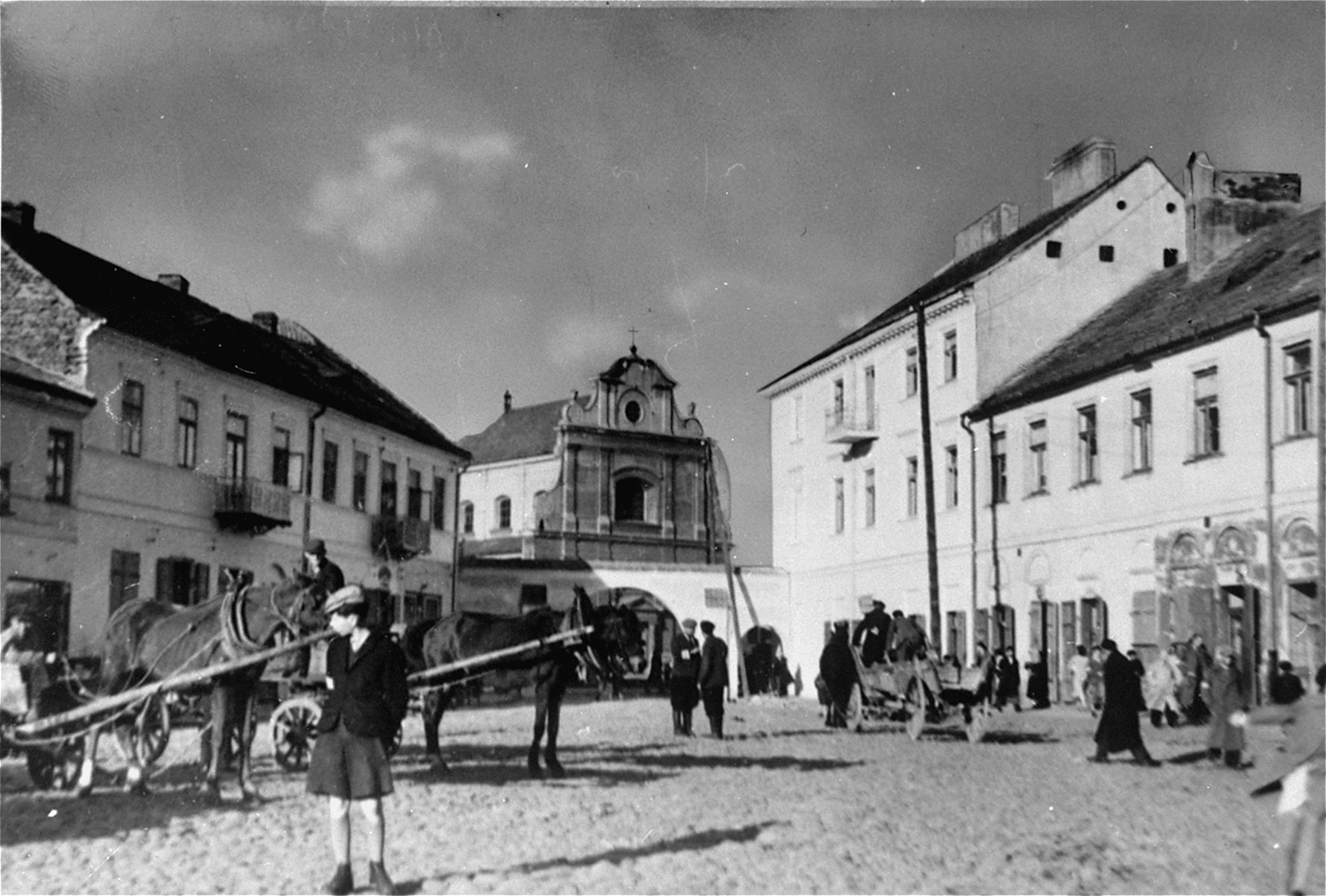
- Main square of the Radom Ghetto with gate
- Also known as: Jüdischer Wohnbezirk in German
- Location: Central, Eastern and South-Eastern Europe
- Date: 1939–1945
- Incident type: Total of more than 1,000 ghettos created mostly in Central and Eastern Europe
- Perpetrators: Schutzstaffel (SS), Order Police battalions
- Ghetto: Open ghettos, in specified areas (1939); Closed or sealed ghettos (1940–1941); Destruction or extermination ghettos (1942)

Beginning with the invasion of Poland during World War II, the Nazi regime set up ghettos across German-occupied Eastern Europe in order to segregate and confine Jews, and sometimes Romani people, into small sections of towns and cities furthering their exploitation. In German documents, and signage at ghetto entrances, the Nazis usually referred to them as Jüdischer Wohnbezirk or Wohngebiet der Juden, both of which translate as the Jewish Quarter. There were several distinct types including open ghettos, closed ghettos, work, transit, and destruction ghettos, as defined by Holocaust historians. In a number of cases, they were the place of Jewish underground resistance against the German occupation, known collectively as the ghetto uprisings.

== Background and establishment of the ghettos ==
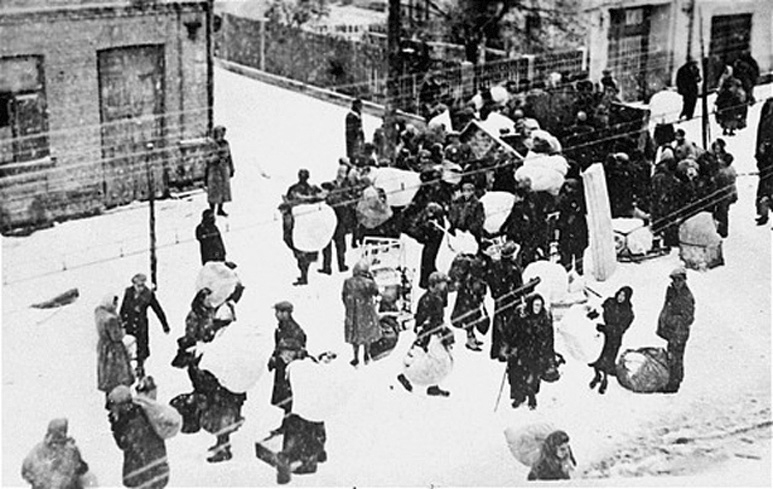
Jews being forced into the new Grodno Ghetto in Bezirk Bialystok, November 1941

The first anti-Jewish measures were enacted in Germany with the onset of Nazism; these measures did not include ghettoizing German Jews: such plans were rejected in the post-Kristallnacht period. However, soon after the 1939 German invasion of Poland, the Nazis began to designate areas of larger Polish cities and towns as exclusively Jewish, and within weeks, embarked on a massive programme of uprooting Polish Jews from their homes and businesses through forcible expulsions. Entire Jewish communities were deported into these closed off zones by train from their places of origin systematically, using Order Police battalions, first in the Reichsgaue, and then throughout the Generalgouvernement territory.

The Nazis had a special hatred of Polish and other eastern Jews. Nazi ideology depicted Jews, Slavs and Roma as inferior race Untermenschen ("subhumans") who threatened the purity of Germany's Aryan Herrenrasse ("master race"), and viewed these people and also political opponents of the Nazi party as parasitic vermin or diseases that endangered the overall health of the Volksgemeinschaft, the German racial community. German doctors and public health officials helped advance these racist fearmongering ideas. The German invasion of Poland (1 September 1939) and the formation of Jewish ghettos caused hunger and poverty, crowding and unsanitary conditions, which in turn actually created typhus epidemics in occupied Poland. German physicians and public health officials in the Nazi regime did not acknowledge this; instead, German medical professionals published essays blaming Jewish people's supposed "low cultural level" and "uncleanliness" for the typhoid epidemics. Posters depicting Jews as lice, which transmit from person to person the bacteria that causes epidemic typhus, were publicized, and the respected status of German doctors helped spread the belief that the Jews were responsible for spreading typhus. The German public health officials in occupied Poland were concerned only with the health of German personnel, so they repeatedly urged occupation authorities to isolate Jews further from the rest of the population.

German forces regarded the establishment of ghettos as temporary measures, in order to allow higher level Nazis in Berlin to decide how to execute their goal of eradicating Jews from Europe. Nazi officials had an Endziel, an unarticulated final goal that would take time to reach, and also an Endlösung, a "final solution" which was a euphemism for the murder of Jews. Toward the Endziel and Endloesung there were intermediate goals to be carried out in the short term, and one of these was to concentrate Jews from the countryside into larger cities, thus making certain areas Judenrein ("clean of Jews").

The first ghetto of World War II was established on 8 October 1939 at Piotrków Trybunalski (38 days after the invasion), with the Tuliszków ghetto established in December 1939. The first large metropolitan ghetto known as the Łódź Ghetto (Litzmannstadt) followed them in April 1940, and the Warsaw Ghetto in October. Most Jewish ghettos were established in 1940 and 1941. Subsequently, many ghettos were sealed from the outside, walled off with brickwork, or enclosed with barbed wire. In the case of sealed ghettos, any Jew caught leaving could be shot. The Warsaw Ghetto, located in the heart of the city, was the largest ghetto in Nazi occupied Europe, with over 400,000 Jews crammed into an area of 3.4 square kilometres (1 3/8 square miles). The Łódź Ghetto was the second largest, holding about 160,000 people. According to the United States Holocaust Memorial Museum archives, there were at least 1,000 such ghettos in German-occupied and annexed Poland and the Soviet Union alone.

== Living conditions ==
Ghettos across Eastern Europe varied in their size, scope and living conditions. The conditions in the ghettos were generally brutal. In Warsaw, the Jews, comprising 30% of the city overall population, were forced to live in 2.4% of the city's area, a density of 7.2 people per room. In the ghetto of Odrzywół, 700 people lived in an area previously occupied by five families, between 12 and 30 to each room. The Jews were not allowed out of the ghetto, so they had to rely on smuggling and the starvation rations supplied by the Nazis: in Warsaw this was 1,060 kJ (253 kcal) per Jew, compared to 2,800 kJ (669 kcal) per Pole and 10,930 kJ (2,613 kcal) per German. With the crowded living conditions, starvation diets, and insufficient sanitation (coupled with lack of medical supplies), epidemics of infectious disease became a major feature of ghetto life. In the Łódź Ghetto some 43,800 people died of 'natural' causes, and 76,000 in the Warsaw Ghetto before July 1942.

== Types of ghettos ==
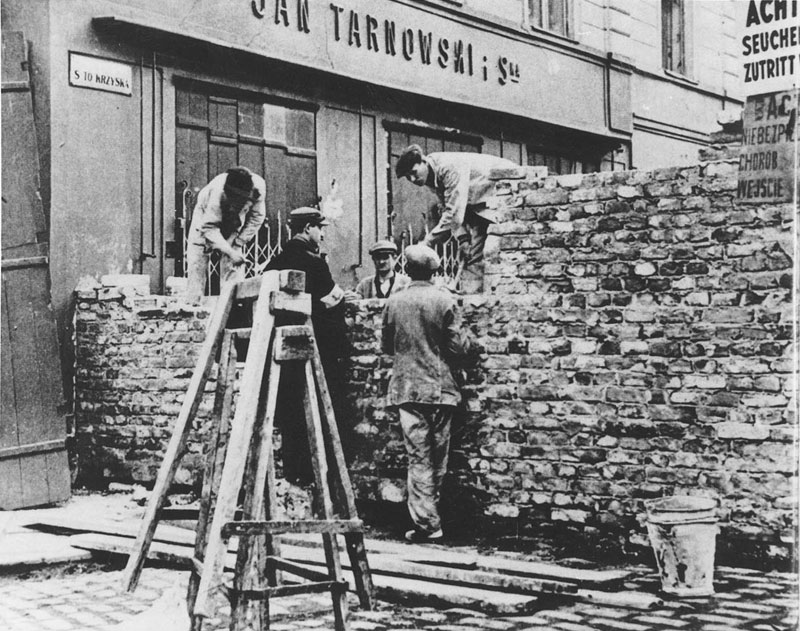
Warsaw Ghetto; walling-off Świętokrzyska Street (seen from "Aryan side" of Marszałkowska)

To prevent unauthorised contact between the Jewish and non-Jewish populations, German Order Police battalions were assigned to patrol the perimeter. Within each ghetto, a Jewish Ghetto Police force was created to ensure that no prisoners tried to escape. In general terms, there were three types of ghettos maintained by the Nazi administration.

- Open ghettos did not have walls or fences, and existed mostly in initial stages of World War II in German-occupied Poland and the occupied Soviet Union, but also in Transnistria province of Ukraine occupied and administered by Romanian authorities. There were severe restrictions on entering and leaving them.
- Closed or sealed ghettos were situated mostly in German-occupied Poland. They were surrounded by brick walls, fences or barbed wire stretched between posts. Jews were not allowed to live in any other areas under the threat of capital punishment. In the closed ghettos the living conditions were the worst. The quarters were extremely crowded and unsanitary. Starvation, chronic shortages of food, lack of heat in winter and inadequate municipal services led to frequent outbreaks of epidemics such as dysentery and typhus and to a high mortality rate. Most Nazi ghettos were of this particular type.
- The destruction or extermination ghettos existed in the final stages of the Holocaust, for between two and six weeks only, in German-occupied Soviet Union (especially in Lithuania and Ukraine), in Hungary, and in occupied Poland. They were tightly sealed off. The Jewish population was imprisoned in them only to be deported or taken out of town and shot by the German killing squads, often with the aid of local collaborationist Auxiliary Police battalions.

=== Aryan side ===
The parts of a city outside the walls of the Jewish Quarter were called "Aryan". For example, in Warsaw, the city was divided into Jewish, Polish, and German Quarters. Those living outside the ghetto had to have identification papers proving they were not Jewish (none of their grandparents was a member of the Jewish community), such as a baptism certificate. Such documents were sometimes called "Christian" or "Aryan papers". Poland's Catholic clergy massively forged baptism certificates, which were given to Jews by the dominant Polish resistance movement, the Home Army (Armia Krajowa, or AK). Any Pole found by the Germans to be giving any help to a Jew was subject to the death penalty.

== Liquidation ==
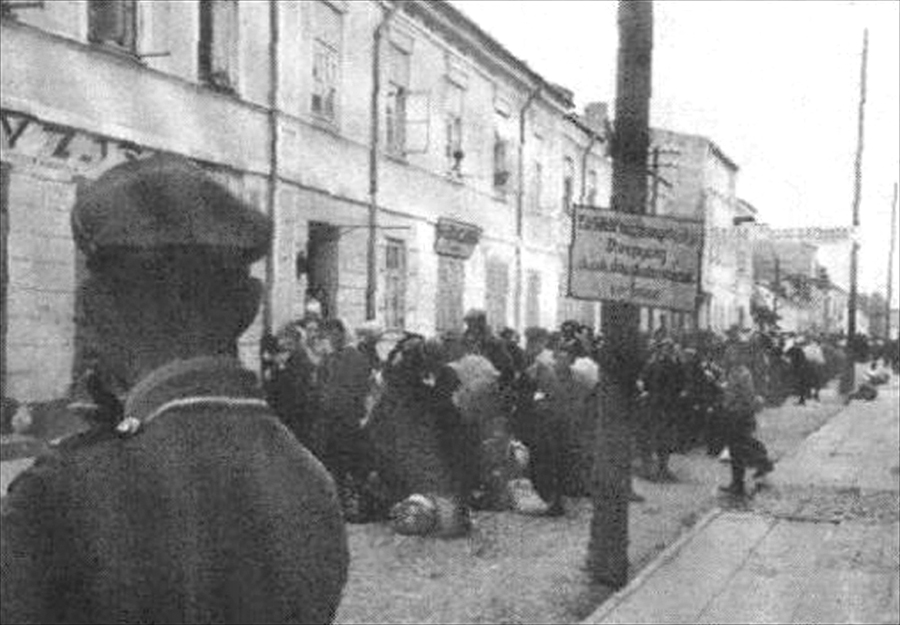
Deportation to a death camp during liquidation of the Biała Podlaska Ghetto conducted by the Reserve Police Battalion 101 in 1942

In 1942, the Nazis began Operation Reinhard, the systematic deportation of Jews to extermination camps. Nazi authorities throughout Europe deported Jews to ghettos in Eastern Europe or most often directly to extermination camps built by Nazi Germany in occupied Poland. Almost 300,000 people were deported from the Warsaw Ghetto alone to Treblinka over the course of 52 days. In some ghettos, local resistance organizations staged ghetto uprisings. None were successful, and the Jewish populations of the ghettos were almost entirely killed. On June 21, 1943, Heinrich Himmler issued an order to liquidate all ghettos and transfer remaining Jewish inhabitants to concentration camps. A few ghettos were re-designated as concentration camps and existed until 1944.

== See also ==
- Jewish ghettos in German-occupied Poland
- Judendienstordnung
- Judenrat
