= Izbash formula =

Mathematical expression for the stability of rocks in water currents

The Izbash formula is a mathematical expression used to calculate the stability of armourstone in flowing water environments.

For the assessment of granular material stability in a current, the Shields formula and the Izbash formula are commonly employed. The former is more appropriate for fine-grained materials like sand and gravel, whereas the Izbash formula is tailored for larger stone sizes. The Izbash formula was devised by Sergei Vladimirovich Izbash. Its general expression is as follows:

$$\frac{u_c}{\sqrt {\Delta g d}} = 1.7$$
or alternatively
$$\Delta d = 0.7 \frac{u^2}{2g}$$

Here, the variables represent:

u_{c} = flow velocity in proximity to the stone
Δ = relative density of the stone, calculated as (ρ_{s} - ρ_{w})/ρ_{w} where ρ_{s} denotes the stone's density and ρ_{w} is the water's density
g = gravitational acceleration
d = diameter of the stone

The coefficient 1.7 is an experimental constant determined by Izbash, encapsulating effects such as friction, inertia, and the turbulence of the current. Hence, the application of this coefficient is limited to conditions where turbulence is predominantly induced by the roughness of the construction materials in water. Adjustments are necessary when these conditions do not apply.

== Derivation of the Izbash Formula ==
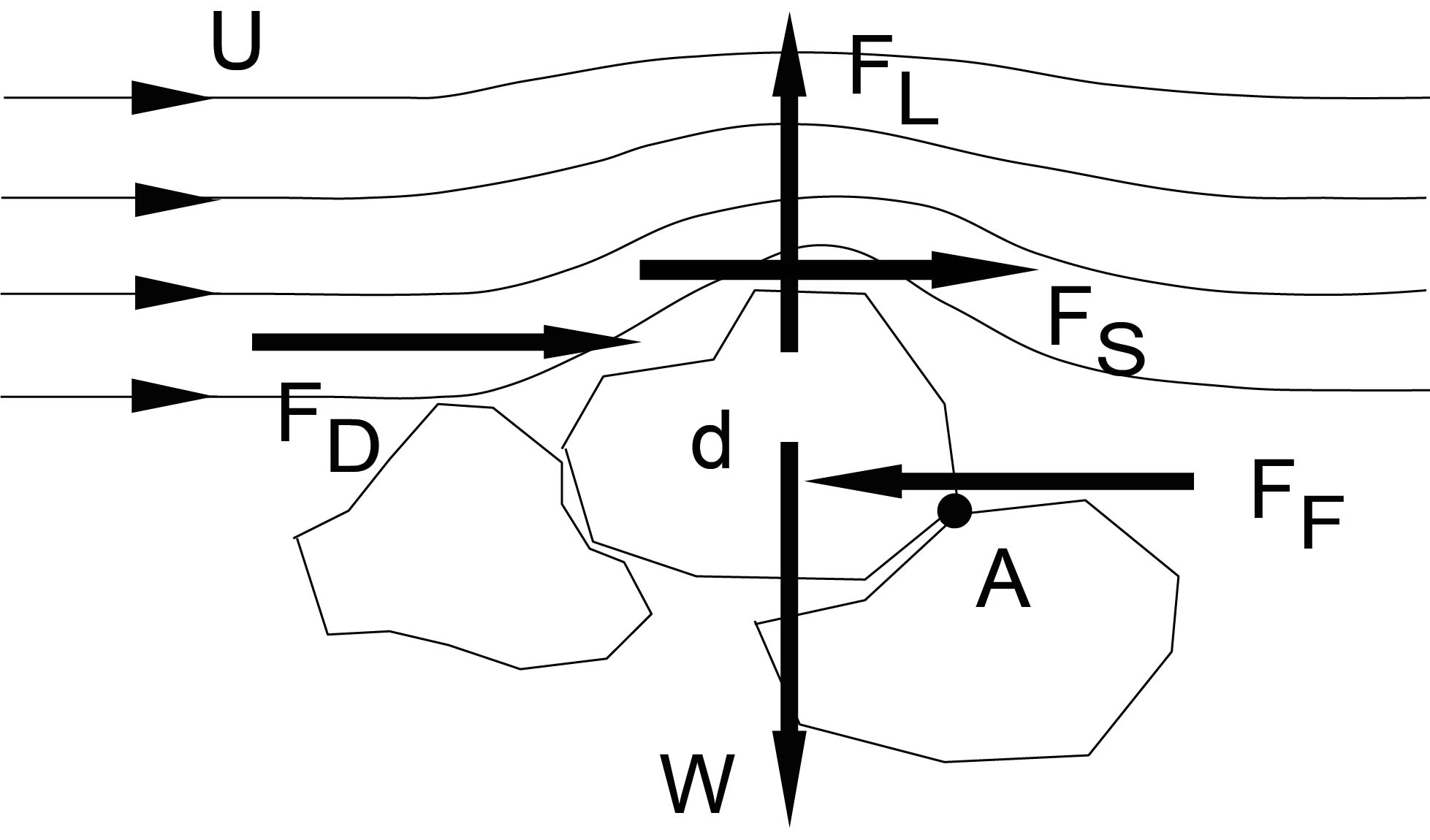
Forces acting on a stone in flowing water

The derivation of the formula begins by considering the forces at play on a stone in a flowing current. These are grouped into active forces that tend to dislodge the stone, and passive forces that resist this movement:

- Active Forces:
  - Lift Force (F_{L}): Arises due to the flow of water around the stone, creating a pressure difference.
  - Friction Force (F_{S}): Results from the contact between the stone and the riverbed.
  - Drag Force (F_{D}): Generated by the flow of water against the stone's surface.
- Passive Forces:
  - The Stone's Weight (W): The downward force due to gravity.
  - Resistance Force (F_{F}): The opposition offered by the bed's surface or other stones.

Each active force can be quantified in terms of the water's density (ρ_{w}), the flow velocity (u), and respective coefficients and areas of influence (C_{D}, C_{F}, C_{L}, A_{D}, A_{S}, A_{L}). The three active forces and two passive forces described above are considered. Analysing the moment equilibrium around point A results in F_{F} being disregarded due to its zero arm length. The active forces can then be detailed as:

$$\begin{matrix} F_D &= \frac{1}{2}C_D \rho_w u^2 A_D \\ F_S &= \frac{1}{2}C_F \rho_w u^2 A_S \\ F_L & = \frac{1}{2}C_L \rho_w u^2 A_L \end{matrix} \quad \Biggr] \quad F \sim \rho_w u^2 d^2$$

The total active force is proportional to the square of the flow velocity and the stone's diameter, represented as ρ_{w}u²d². The resisting passive force is proportional to the stone's submerged weight, which involves the gravitational constant (g), the stone's volume (proportional to d³), and the difference in density between the stone and the water (ρ_{s} - ρ_{w}), represented by Δ.

Balancing the active forces against the passive ones yields the critical flow velocity equation:

$$u_c^2 = K \Delta g d$$

K is an empirical coefficient calibrated through experimental observations, and has been found to be around 1.7.

The formula therefore provides a critical velocity estimate: the threshold at which the forces acting on a stone due to flow surpass the stone's resistance to movement.

== Calculation Example ==
Consider determining the requisite stone size to protect the base of a channel with a depth of 1 m and an average flow rate of 2 m/s.

The stone diameter necessary for protection can be estimated by reconfiguring the formula and inserting the relevant data. The Izbash formula necessitates the use of the velocity "near the stone," which is ambiguous. Practically, a velocity approximately equivalent to the stone's diameter above the protective layer is assumed. This translates to about 85% of the channel's average flow velocity when employing a standard logarithmic flow profile, resulting in a stone diameter of approximately 6.3 cm (comparable to the 6.5 cm predicted by the Shields formula).

== Limitations ==
The application of the formula necessitates the measurement of velocity in proximity to the stone, a task that can be challenging, particularly in fine-grained soils and at significant water depths. Under such conditions, the Shields formula is often considered a more suitable alternative.

== Modification by Pilarczyk ==
Recognising the prevalent usage of the coefficient 0.7, Krystian Pilarczyk refined the formula in 1985 for enhanced specificity. The revised equation is expressed as:

$$\Delta d = 0.035 \frac{\Phi}{\Psi}\frac{K_t K_h}{K_s}\frac{u^2}{2 g}$$

where:

Φ represents the stability parameter, which adjusts the formula for different construction types:

Construction Type	Stability Parameter (Φ)
End of a single layer of rock	1.25
End of bed protection	1.0
Two-layer rock bed protection	0.75
Continuous bed protections	0.50
Most conservative value	1.5

Ψ denotes the Shields parameter, with typical values shown in the table below:

Revetment Type	Ψ (-)
Riprap/small rock bags	0.035
Placed blocks/geobags	0.05
Blockmats	0.07
Gabions	0.07 (to 0.10)
Geomattress	0.07

K_{t} = turbulence factor, with values as below:

Flow Condition	Turbulence Factor (K_{t})
Low-turbulence flow	0.67
Normal turbulence	1.0
River bends	1.5
Sharp river bends (radius < 5 times river width)	2.0 - 2.5
High turbulence flow (e.g., propeller wash)	3.0
Extreme turbulence (e.g., propeller wash at moored ships)	4.0

K_{h} = depth factor

- Typically, $K_h = \frac{2}{\log(\frac{12 h}{N d})^2}$, where N ranges from 1 to 3
- k_{h} for an undeveloped velocity profile: $(1+\frac{h}{d})^{0.2}$

K_{s} = slope factor

- The value of K_{s} corresponds to either $K(\alpha_\parallel)$ or $K(\alpha)$ (as detailed below).

The destabilizing influences on a slope's stability can be quantified by examining two principal forces:

1. A component of force parallel to the slope, expressed as W sin(α), where W is the weight of the object and α is the slope angle. This force promotes downslope movement.
2. A component of force perpendicular to the slope, W cos(α), enhancing the normal force and thus the friction opposing movement.

In the figure below, φ represents the angle of internal friction or the angle of repose of the soil. When the flow direction aligns with the slope's inclination (Figure b), the perpendicular force impacting stability is:

$$F(\alpha_{\text{perpendicular}}) = W \cos(\alpha) \tan(\phi) - W \sin(\alpha)$$

If the flow is in the opposite direction, the stone's stability increases:

$$F = W \cos(\alpha) \tan(\phi) + W \sin(\alpha)$$

The strength reduction factor due to the slope is then:

$$K(\alpha_{\parallel}) = \frac{F(\alpha_{\parallel})}{F(0)} = \frac{W \cos(\alpha) \tan(\phi) - W \sin(\alpha)}{W \tan(\phi)} = \frac{\sin(\phi - \alpha)}{\sin(\phi)}$$

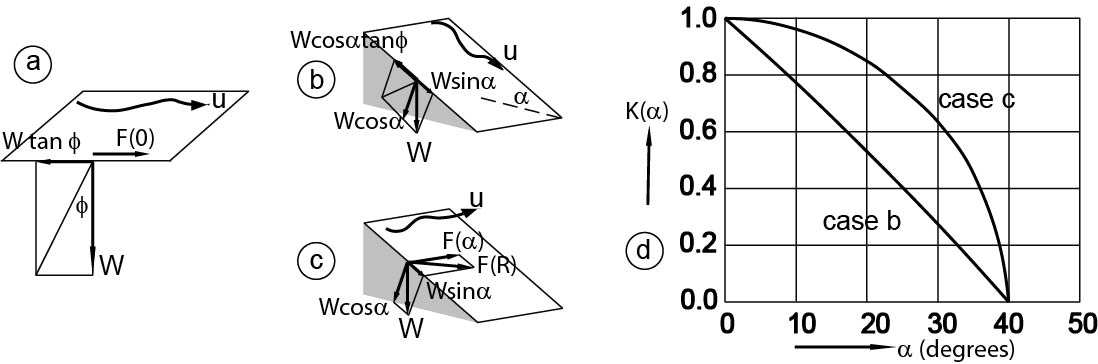
Slope effect of a current

For slopes transverse to the flow at an angle α (Figure c), the stability reduction factor is:

$$K(\alpha) = \frac{F(\alpha)}{F(0)} = \sqrt{\frac{\cos^2(\alpha) \tan^2(\phi) - \sin^2(\alpha)}{\tan^2(\phi)}} = \sqrt{1 - \frac{\sin^2(\alpha)}{\sin^2(\phi)}}$$

Figure d illustrates the reduction factors for stability at a slope with an angle of φ = 40 degrees, demonstrating the impact of slope angle relative to flow direction on the stability of objects.

Due to the fact that a depth factor, K_{h}, is included in this version of the Izbash formula, the average velocity above the stones can be considered for the velocity used in the calculations. This is a revision from the original Izbash formula, which ambiguously specified that the speed was "near to the stone".

== Effect of turbulence ==
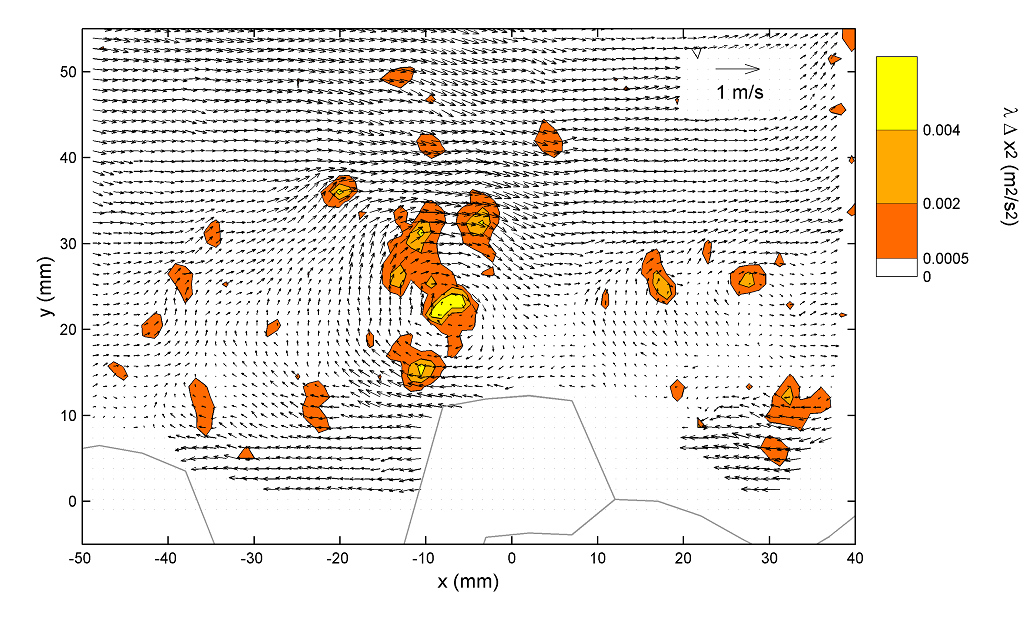
Relative velocity in a vortex near a stone

Turbulence exerts a significant effect on stability. Turbulent vortices cause locally high velocities at the stone, generating a lift force on one side, while the absence of such a force on the other side can eject the stone from its bed. This mechanism is depicted in the accompanying image (see right), where the detailed drawing illustrates the stone positioned at the coordinate (0,0), with the relative velocity creating an upward lift force to the left, and no lift force to the right, resulting in a clockwise moment that can flip the stone out of the bed along with the normal lift force of the main flow. This selective motion explains why not all stones are set in motion by a given current speed, but only when an appropriate vortex passes by.

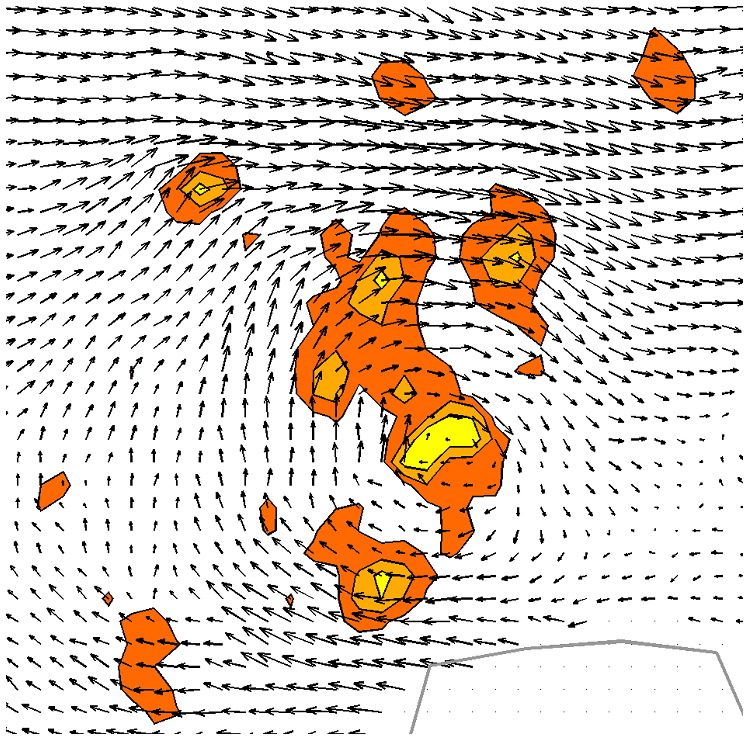
Detail of the velocity near a stone

These illustrations represent flow rate measurements in a vertical plane above a stone, with the flow moving from left to right. Displayed is the velocity after subtracting the average speed, i.e., the u and v components (for further explanation, see the main article on Turbulence modelling).

The impact of turbulence is particularly pronounced when the size of turbulent vortices is comparable to that of the stones. It is feasible to modify the Izbash formula to more explicitly incorporate the effects of turbulence. A stone at rest will not move until the total velocity (i.e., the average velocity plus the additional velocity from turbulent vortices) surpasses a specific threshold. Research indicates that this critical velocity is $\overline{u} + 3 \sigma = (1+3r)\overline{u}$, where $\sigma$ represents the standard deviation of the velocity and r denotes the relative turbulence. In the original Izbash formula, the coefficient of 1.7 encompasses a component accounting for turbulence. The formula can be reformulated as:

$$\Delta d = 0.7 \frac{u^2}{2g} = c_{iz} \frac{\left[ u(1+3r) \right]^2}{2g}$$

Assuming a relative turbulence of r=0.075 for turbulence induced by bed roughness, the revised formula leads to $c_{iz}$ = 0.47. This revision introduces an explicit turbulence parameter into the Izbash formula:

$$\Delta d = 0.47 \frac{\left[ u(1+3r) \right]^2}{2g}$$

This adaptation allows the use of the Izbash formula in scenarios where turbulence is not solely the result of bed roughness but also occurs in flows influenced by ships and propellers. In the wake of a vessel in a narrow channel, a strong return flow with increased turbulence is observed, where r is typically around 0.2. For propeller-induced turbulence, an r value of 0.45 is recommended. Given that the relative turbulence appears quadratically in the formula, it is evident that for a propeller flow, a substantially larger stone size is required for bed protection compared to "normal" flow conditions.

For non-typical cases, a turbulence model such as the k-epsilon model can be utilised to calculate the value of r. This value can then be inserted into the aforementioned modified Izbash formula to ascertain the necessary stone size.
