= Gmina Tuliszków =

Gmina Tuliszków Tuliszków Commune
- Gmina
- Coat of arms

- Coordinates (Tuliszków): 52°4′36″N 18°17′38″E
- Country: Poland
- Voivodeship: Greater Poland
- County: Turek
- Seat: Tuliszków

Area
  - Total: 149.44 km^{2} (57.70 sq mi)

Population (2006)
  - Total: 10,510
  - Density: 70.33/km^{2} (182.2/sq mi)
  - Urban: 3,393
  - Rural: 7,117
- Time zone: UTC+1 (CET)
  - Summer (DST): UTC+2 (CEST)
- Vehicle registration: PTU
- Website: http://www.tuliszkow.pl

Gmina Tuliszków is an urban-rural gmina (administrative district) in Turek County, Greater Poland Voivodeship, in central Poland. Its seat is the town of Tuliszków, which lies approximately 16 kilometres (10 mi) north-west of Turek and 101 km (63 mi) east of the regional capital Poznań.

The gmina covers an area of 149.44 square kilometres (57.7 sq mi), and as of 2006 its total population is 10,510 (out of which the population of Tuliszków amounts to 3,393, and the population of the rural part of the gmina is 7,117).

== Villages ==
Apart from the town of Tuliszków, Gmina Tuliszków contains the villages and settlements of Babiak, Dryja, Gadowskie Holendry, Gozdów, Grabowiec, Grzymiszew, Imiełków, Józinki, Kępina, Kiszewy, Krępa, Nowy Świat, Ogorzelczyn, Piętno, Ruda, Sarbicko, Smaszew, Tarnowa, Wielopole, Wróblina, Wymysłów and Zadworna.

== Neighbouring gminas ==
Gmina Tuliszków is bordered by the gminas of Krzymów, Malanów, Mycielin, Rychwał, Stare Miasto, Turek and Władysławów.
