= Ruda, Turek County =

Ruda
- Village
- Location within Poland
- Coordinates: 52°4′N 18°24′E
- Country: Poland
- Voivodeship: Greater Poland
- County: Turek
- Gmina: Tuliszków

Population
  - Total: 240
- Time zone: UTC+1 (CET)
  - Summer (DST): UTC+2 (CEST)

Ruda [ˈruda] is a village in the administrative district of Gmina Tuliszków, within Turek County, Greater Poland Voivodeship, in central Poland.
