= Imiełków =

- Village
- Location within Poland
- Coordinates: 52°2′3″N 18°23′37″E
- Country: Poland
- Voivodeship: Greater Poland
- County: Turek
- Gmina: Tuliszków
- Population: 220

Imiełków [iˈmjɛu̯kuf] is a village in the administrative district of Gmina Tuliszków, within Turek County, Greater Poland Voivodeship, in west-central Poland.
