= Nowy Świat, Gmina Tuliszków =

Nowy Świat
- Village
- Location within Poland
- Coordinates: 52°4′N 18°14′E
- Country: Poland
- Voivodeship: Greater Poland
- County: Turek
- Gmina: Tuliszków
- Population: 70

Nowy Świat (Polish pronunciation: [ˈnɔvɨ ˈɕfjat]) is a village in the administrative district of Gmina Tuliszków, within Turek County, Greater Poland Voivodeship, in west-central Poland.
