= Piętno, Greater Poland Voivodeship =

Piętno
- Village
- Location within Poland
- Coordinates: 52°1′N 18°21′E
- Country: Poland
- Voivodeship: Greater Poland
- County: Turek
- Gmina: Tuliszków
- Population: 450

Piętno [ˈpjɛntnɔ] is a village in the administrative district of Gmina Tuliszków, within Turek County, Greater Poland Voivodeship, in west-central Poland.
