= Grabowiec, Turek County =

Grabowiec
- Village
- Location within Poland
- Coordinates: 52°6′N 18°20′E
- Country: Poland
- Voivodeship: Greater Poland
- County: Turek
- Gmina: Tuliszków

Grabowiec [ɡraˈbɔvjɛt͡s] is a village in the administrative district of Gmina Tuliszków, within Turek County, Greater Poland Voivodeship, in west-central Poland.
