= Albert F. Shields =

American engineer

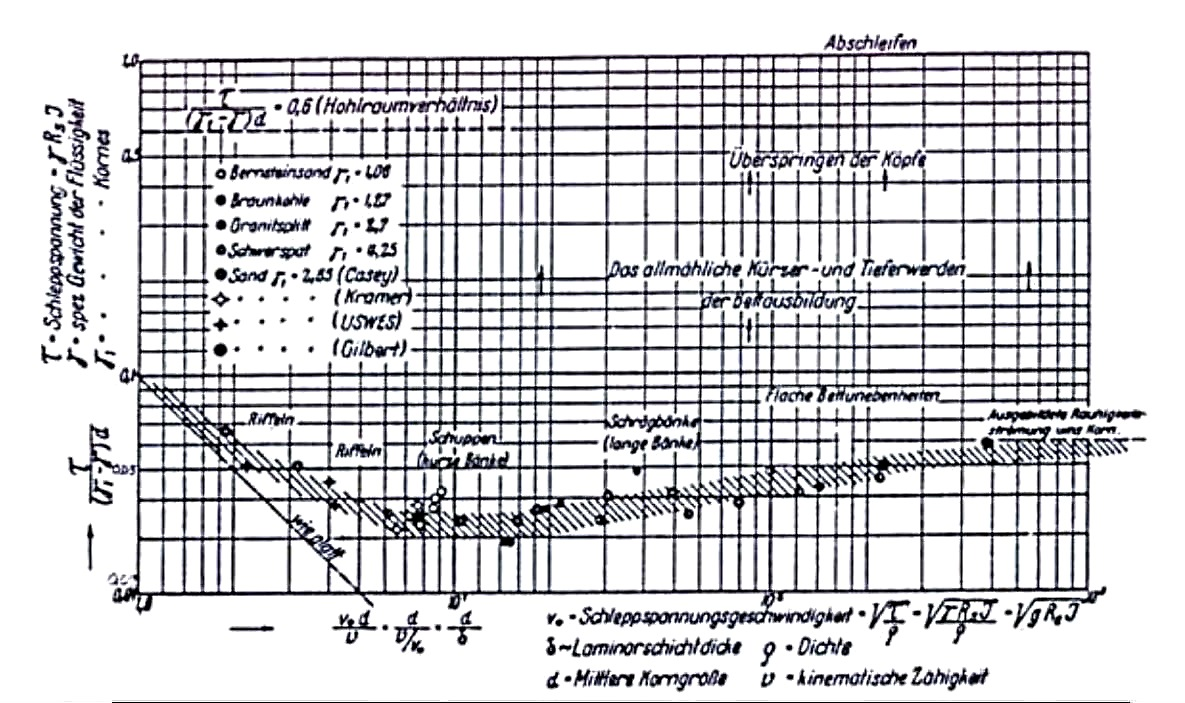
Original Shields diagram, 1936

Albert Frank Shields (June 26, 1908 – July 1, 1974) was an American mechanical engineer who is best known for his derivation of the formula for determining the beginning of movement of sand and gravel in currents (incipient motion). The dimensionless Shields parameter is called after him.

== Training ==
Albert Shields was born in Cleveland, Ohio. He was the son of an unprosperous family. He studied at the Stevens Institute of Technology, where he received his master's degree in 1933. He then received a scholarship from the Deutschen Akademischen Austauschdienst and studied in Germany at the Preussische Versuchsanstalt für Wasserbau und Schiffbau (Prussian Research Institute for Water and Shipbuilding); PVWS). His intention was to get his PhD there on a subject in shipbuilding (the TH Berlin was at that time leading in this area). However, the grant was very limited and only covered the cost of living in Germany and not the travel costs. Shields paid for his crossing by working on a freighter to Germany.

== His time in Germany ==
After arriving in Germany in 1934, it was found that PVWS had only research sites in the shipbuilding sector, where the researcher himself had to make a financial contribution to the research. As Shields did not have any extra money, this was not possible (in addition, the value of his grant was significantly reduced due to the massive inflation). The only option offered to him was to continue research into the stability of bed material in watercourses (Geschiebebewegung). This investigation was initiated by Franz Eisner, who had committed suicide in 1933 because he had been expelled from his position by the Nazis. Shields was given the office of Eisner (Eisner had committed suicide in this office) and he was assigned two assistants. Shields continued to work on the investigation that had been initiated before him by Hans Kramer and Hugh John Casey (both also American bursals in Germany). Since Shields as a mechanical engineer had no background knowledge in this, he had to make it his own first. His promoter was Dr. Ing. Adolf Ludin, a convinced Nazi with a dislike of Americans. Fortunately, he had nothing to do with him in his daily work. He only met Ludin twice, at the start of the research and at his PhD.

In 1935 it was also clear that the TH Berlin did not recognise his Stevens engineering degree; He was forced to obtain a German master's degree (Dipl-Ing). He did so in between with Prof. Föttinger of the TH Charlottenburg, led by Dr. Weinig. This led to a thesis on mapping the phreatic line in dams (hodograph). This thesis was judged very well and even led to a publication. Because he had to finish this extra master's degree, he got into financial difficulties and had to look for a job. He couldn't find a job in Berlin. Finally, he found a job at a steelworks in the Saarland area of Germany. He worked here in the summer of 1935.

In the autumn of 1935 he was able to continue his research at PVWS somewhat after hassle and by the spring of 1936 the research was completed and the manuscript of his dissertation was completed. After some minor improvements, the dissertation was submitted to the Berlin TH in May 1936 and his promoter, prof. Ludin. On 30 June it was (oral) exam; Prof. Ludin listened to his presentation without any comment. Right after the presentation, Ludin only gave some derogatory remarks and left. Shields never spoke to him again. Shields did not even have a copy of the dissertation, which he had lent to one of the examiners. A few days later, he received a message that his dissertation had been assessed with a “Gut” (a 7 on scale 1 to 10). Shields was disappointed with this result and wanted to go home as soon as possible. It was customary at that time for a dissertation to appear in print only after it was defended. The director of PVWS, Prof. Seifert, promised to send Shields 200 copies of the dissertation; Shields, however, was never allowed to receive it.

In this dissertation, Shields presented a graph for the stability of sand and gravel in currents based on a dimensionless number (later called the Shields parameter, as well as a formula for calculating that stability and a sand transport formula, the Shields formula. These results are an important basis of current knowledge in the field of sediment transport.

He still had a few obligations to PVWS. At this time, he managed to do some research with Dr. Weinbaum on the wave resistance on ship hulls. This was the research he actually came to Berlin for.

== His later career ==
After his return to the United States, he could not find work in his field. He tried to find a job at the California Institute of Technology, but they had no vacancy. Finally, he found a job at the S&S (Stokes & Smith?) Corrugated Paper Machinery Co., Inc. in Brooklyn near New York, where he worked briefly before leaving for Germany. He has mainly worked on improving paper machines, and has received a number of patents for this purpose. In 1973 he became head of the engineering department. This job and the income from the patents gave him a financially good position. When he retired, he was able to afford a winter home in Florida and a summer home in Connecticut next to his home Forest Hills (a district of New York). He never published anything in the field of sediment transport again.

== Contacts with Hunter Rouse ==
During his stay in Berlin, Shields also had contact with Hunter Rouse who made a trip through Europe during that period. Rouse then had a draft of his dissertation, and was very impressed. He used this information in two publications of 1939. By 1940, the concept of bed stability of Shields was widely known in hydraulic circles in the United States. Rouse happened to find his name at a convention (on mechanical engineering) later in 1939 and found his address. He then wrote a letter to Shields complimenting his dissertation. Shields’ answer was telling: My heartiest thanks for the very kind letter you have written me! This has been an especially appreciated since it is not only the first thing I have heard about that work but is even the first comment that has been made on it to me. By Rouse was later still searched for the original measurement data of Shields’ research, which Shields did not themselves but had stayed in Berlin. They were lost there during the war.
