= Kępina, Greater Poland Voivodeship =

Kępina
- Village
- Location within Poland
- Coordinates: 52°7′10″N 18°18′17″E
- Country: Poland
- Voivodeship: Greater Poland
- County: Turek
- Gmina: Tuliszków
- Population: 80

Kępina [kɛmˈpina] is a village in the administrative district of Gmina Tuliszków, within Turek County, Greater Poland Voivodeship, in west-central Poland.
