= Wielopole, Greater Poland Voivodeship =

Wielopole
- Village
- Location within Poland
- Coordinates: 52°1′N 18°20′E
- Country: Poland
- Voivodeship: Greater Poland
- County: Turek
- Gmina: Tuliszków
- Population: 330

Wielopole [vjɛlɔˈpɔlɛ] is a village in the administrative district of Gmina Tuliszków, within Turek County, Greater Poland Voivodeship, in west-central Poland.
