= Elżbieta Frąckowiak =

Polish electrochemical engineer

- Born: November 17, 1950 (age 75); Kiszewy, Poland
- Citizenship: Poland
- Education: Adam Mickiewicz University
- Known for: Research on carbon-based supercapacitors and energy storage
- Awards: Prize of the Foundation for Polish Science (2011); Officer's Cross of the Order of Polonia Restituta (2011)
- Scientific career
- Fields: Electrochemical engineering
- Workplaces: Poznań University of Technology

Elżbieta Frąckowiak (born 17 November 1950) is a Polish electrochemical engineer whose research concentrates on carbon-based supercapacitors and energy storage. She is a professor in the Faculty of Chemical Technology at the Poznań University of Technology, and a former vice-president of the Polish Academy of Sciences.

== Education and career ==
Frąckowiak studied chemistry at Adam Mickiewicz University in Poznań, earning a master's degree in 1972. After working as a research assistant at the Academy of Mining and Metallurgy in Kraków since 1973, she earned a Ph.D. in applied electrochemistry from the Poznań University of Technology in 1988, and at that time joined the university's Faculty of Chemical Technology as an assistant professor. She completed her habilitation in 2000 and was named a full professor in 2003.

She was vice-president of the Polish Academy of Sciences for 2015–2018.

== Recognition ==
Frąckowiak was elected as a corresponding member of the Polish Academy of Sciences in 2013, and became a full member in 2022. She became a Fellow of the Royal Society of Chemistry in 2014, and was elected to the Academia Europaea in 2022. The International Society of Electrochemistry named her as an ISE Fellow in 2022.

In 2011, Frąckowiak became an Officer in the Order of Polonia Restituta. She was the 2011 winner of the Prize of the Foundation for Polish Science in chemical and materials science, "for research on new materials, carbon composites and their use for electrochemical energy storage and conversion", and the 2012 winner of the Sapienti Sat Medal. In 2021, she was one of six recipients of the Award of the President of the Polish Academy of Sciences, honored "for explaining the influence of redox processes in electrode materials and electrolyte solutions on the operation and long-term cyclic operation of electrochemical capacitors".
