= Józinki, Greater Poland Voivodeship =

Józinki
- Settlement
- Location within Poland
- Coordinates: 52°3′20″N 18°16′55″E
- Country: Poland
- Voivodeship: Greater Poland
- County: Turek
- Gmina: Tuliszków

Józinki [juˈʑinki] is a settlement in the administrative district of Gmina Tuliszków, within Turek County, Greater Poland Voivodeship, in west-central Poland.
