= Krępa, Greater Poland Voivodeship =

Krępa
- Village
- Location within Poland
- Coordinates: 52°5′N 18°15′E
- Country: Poland
- Voivodeship: Greater Poland
- County: Turek
- Gmina: Tuliszków
- Population: 290

Krępa [ˈkrɛmpa] is a village in the administrative district of Gmina Tuliszków, within Turek County, Greater Poland Voivodeship, in west-central Poland.
