= Kiszewy =

- Village
- Location within Poland
- Coordinates: 52°8′N 18°18′E
- Country: Poland
- Voivodeship: Greater Poland
- County: Turek
- Gmina: Tuliszków
- Population: 280

Kiszewy [kiˈʂɛvɨ] is a village in the administrative district of Gmina Tuliszków, within Turek County, Greater Poland Voivodeship, in west-central Poland.
