= Tuliszków =

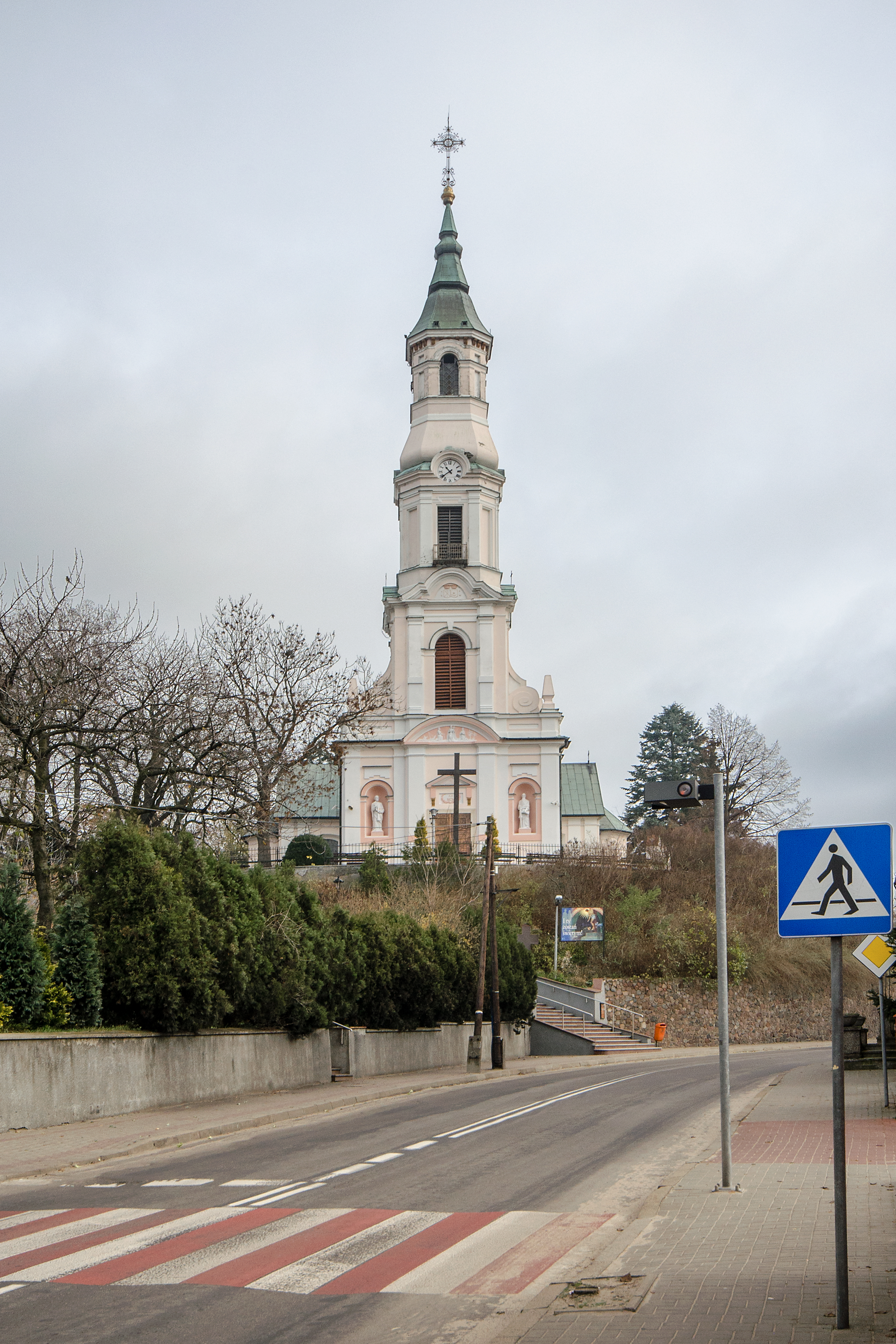
- Church of Saint Vitalis in Tuliszków

- Coat of arms

- Location within Poland
- Coordinates: 52°4′36″N 18°17′38″E
- Country: Poland
- Voivodeship: Greater Poland
- County: Turek
- Gmina: Tuliszków
- First mentioned: 14th century
- Town rights: 1458

Area
  - Total: 7.04 km^{2} (2.72 sq mi)

Population (2010)
  - Total: 3,373
  - Density: 479/km^{2} (1,240/sq mi)
- Time zone: UTC+1 (CET)
  - Summer (DST): UTC+2 (CEST)
- Postal code: 62-740
- Vehicle registration: PTU
- Website: http://www.tuliszkow.pl

Tuliszków pronounced [tuˈliʂkuf] is a town in Turek County, Greater Poland Voivodeship, in central Poland, with 3,373 inhabitants (2010).

== History ==
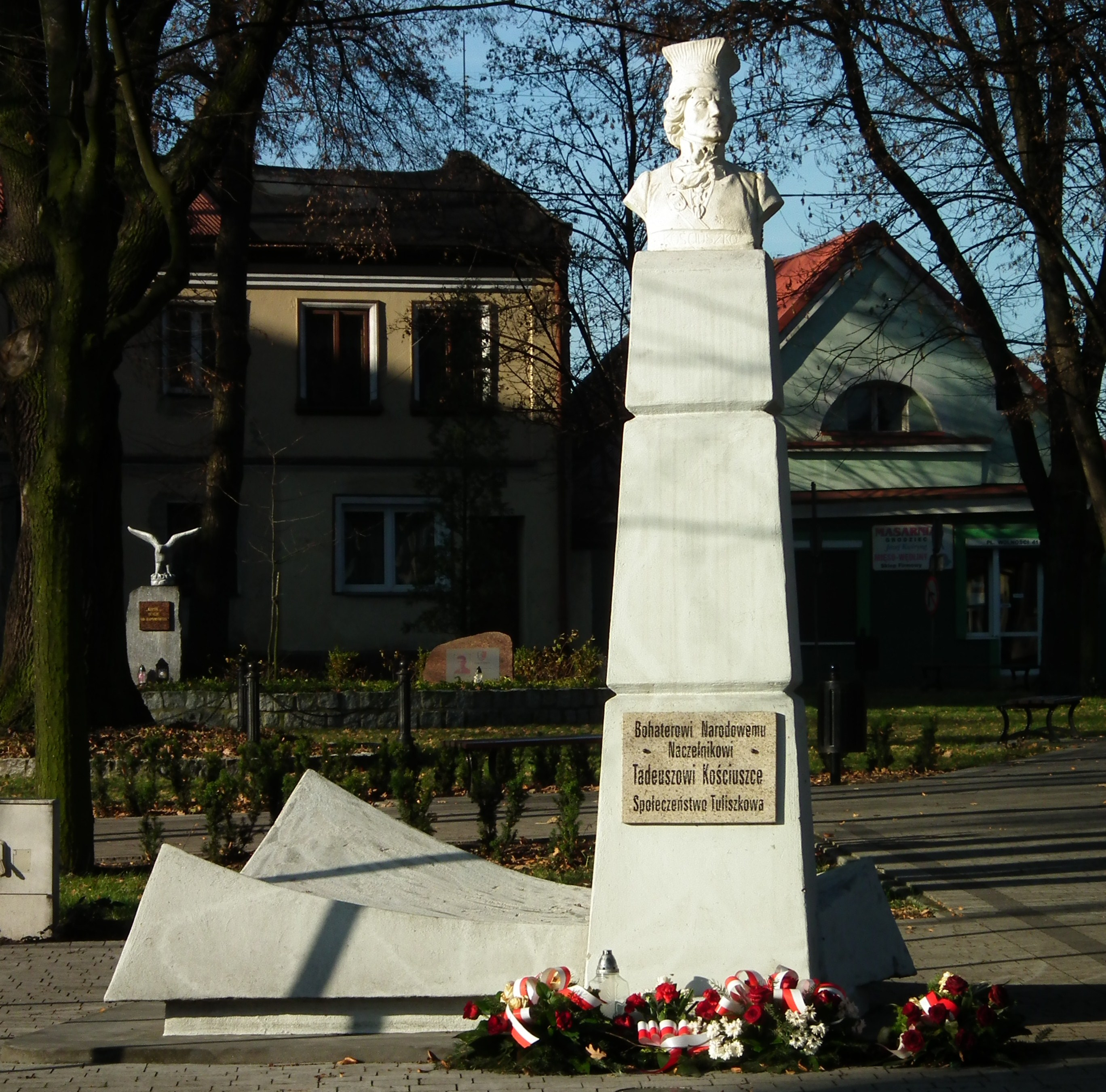
Tadeusz Kościuszko Monument

The oldest mention of Tuliszków in 1320 originates from the Chronicle of Kacper Niesiecki, written three centuries later. Known in Latinized forms as Tviliskow, Tuliscov, or Tuliscovo, the name is of Polish origin, and means fox grounds. It received town privileges in 1458. It has canting arms, depicting a fox, and in addition it also depicts local knight Janusz of Tuliszków holding his Grunwald sword (he fought in the Battle of Grunwald of 1410). It was a private town, administratively located in the Konin County in the Kalisz Voivodeship in the Greater Poland Province of the Kingdom of Poland.

Following the Second Partition of Poland of 1793, it was annexed by Prussia. After the successful Greater Poland uprising of 1806, it was regained by Poles and included within the short-lived Duchy of Warsaw. After the duchy's dissolution, it fell to the Russian Partition of Poland in 1815. Nevertheless, the town grew substantially in the 19th century. During the January Uprising, on February 19, 1864, a small Polish insurgent unit entered the town and seized funds for the uprising. The Russians chased after the insurgents, capturing one of them. Tuliszków was one of many towns stripped of town privileges by the tsar in 1870 as revenge for the January Uprising against the Russian occupation. Much of the town was consumed by fire in 1881. The population of Tuliszków was approximately 2,000 in the beginning of the 20th century. Following Poland's return to independence the town rights were restored in 1919. In the Second Polish Republic the population grew to 2,600 before 1939.

=== Jewish community ===
The Jewish community was 250 people in the 1921 census, led by Rabbi Joel Foks, member of Mizrachi. The economic crisis of the 1930s forced some families to leave in search of a better life.

Following the joint Nazi German and Soviet invasion of Poland, which started World War II in September 1939, the town was occupied by Germany. There were only 230 Jews in Tuliszków at the onset of war, around 10% of the general population. In December 1939 the invading Germans ordered the creation of a Judenrat and forced all adult Jews to wear the Star of David; the community was stripped of money and valuables. Within weeks the ghetto was formed, one of the first Jewish ghettos in German-occupied Poland, and electricity was cut off from it in the dead of winter. Stronger Jews were pressed to forced labour. The ghetto was liquidated in October 1941 and all Jews – men, women and children – deported to transit ghetto in Kowale Pańskie. Some escaped from that ghetto and returned to Tuliszków to hide. Others were sent to forced labor camps near Poznań or to Łódź. Most of those in the Kowale Pańskie ghetto were sent to Chełmno extermination camp. Only one Tuliszkow Jew is known to have survived the war.

== Demographics ==
Historical population

Year	Pop.	±%
1910	2,753	—
1921	2,358	−14.3%
1931	2,559	+8.5%
1939	2,800	+9.4%

Year	Pop.	±%
1950	1,792	−36.0%
1960	2,139	+19.4%
2010	3,373	+57.7%
