= Gozdów, Turek County =

Gozdów
- Village
- Location within Poland
- Coordinates: 52°2′11″N 18°21′36″E
- Country: Poland
- Voivodeship: Greater Poland
- County: Turek
- Gmina: Tuliszków
- Population: 260

Gozdów [ˈɡɔzduf] is a village in the administrative district of Gmina Tuliszków, within Turek County, Greater Poland Voivodeship, in west-central Poland.
