= Dryja, Greater Poland Voivodeship =

Dryja
- Village
- Location within Poland
- Coordinates: 52°6′N 18°17′E
- Country: Poland
- Voivodeship: Greater Poland
- County: Turek
- Gmina: Tuliszków
- Population: 220

Dryja [ˈdrɨja] is a village in the administrative district of Gmina Tuliszków, within Turek County, Greater Poland Voivodeship, in west-central Poland.
