= Shields parameter =

Dimensionless parameter in fluid mechanics

The Shields parameter, also called the Shields criterion or Shields number, is a nondimensional number used to calculate the initiation of motion of sediment in a fluid flow. It is a form of non-dimensionalization of a shear stress, and is typically denoted $\psi$ or $\theta$. This parameter has been developed by Albert F. Shields, and is called later Shields parameter. The Shields parameter is the main parameter of the Shields formula. The Shields parameter is given by:

$$\theta = \frac{\tau}{(\rho_s-\rho) g D},$$

where

- $\tau$ is a dimensional shear stress,
- $\rho_s$ is the density of the sediment,
- $\rho$ is the density of the fluid,
- $g$ is acceleration due to gravity,
- $D$ is a characteristic particle diameter of the sediment.

The critical shear stress and also the critical Shields number ($\tau_\ast$ and $\theta_\ast$) describe the conditions when the sediment starts moving. Note that the shear stress is a property of the current, while the critical shear stress is a property of the sediment.

== Physical meaning ==
By multiplying the top and bottom of the Shields parameter by $D^2$, you can see that it is proportional to the ratio of fluid force on the particle to the weight of the particle.
