= Moldova =

Country in Eastern Europe

Republic of Moldova Republica Moldova
- Flag Coat of arms
- Anthem: Limba noastră "Our language"
- Location of Moldova in Europe (green) and its uncontrolled territory of Transnistria (light green)
- Capital and largest city: Chișinău; 47°0′N 28°55′E
- Official language and national language: Romanian
- Recognised minority languages: See list: Belarusian; Bulgarian; Gagauz; German; Hebrew; Polish; Romani; Russian; Ukrainian
- Ethnic groups (2024; excl. Transnistria): 76.7% Moldovans (Note: There is an ethnolinguistic controversy whether Moldovans are the same as Romanians or a distinct ethnic group.); 8.0% Romanians; 5.1% Ukrainians; 4.0% Gagauz; 3.4% Russians; 1.6% Bulgarians; 1.1% other
- Religion (2024; excl. Transnistria): 97.4% Christianity; 94.3% Eastern Orthodoxy; 3.1% other Christian; 0.3% other; 1.5% no religion; 0.8% unanswered
- Demonym: Moldovan
- Government: Unitary parliamentary republic
  - President: Maia Sandu
  - Prime Minister: Vasile Tofan
  - President of the Parliament: Igor Grosu
- Legislature: Parliament

Formation
  - Principality of Moldavia: 1346
  - Bessarabia Governorate: 1812
  - Moldavian Democratic Republic: 15 December 1917
  - Union with Romania: 9 April 1918
  - Moldavian ASSR: 12 October 1924
  - Moldavian SSR: 2 August 1940
  - Transnistria War: 2 November 1990
  - Independence from the Soviet Union: 27 August 1991 (Note: Date of proclamation. Independence subsequently finalized with the dissolution of the USSR in December 1991.)
  - Constitution adopted: 29 July 1994

Area
  - Incl. Transnistria: 33,843 km^{2} (13,067 sq mi) (135th)
  - Water (%): 1.4 (incl. Transnistria)
  - Excl. Transnistria: 30,319 km^{2} (11,706 sq mi) (Note: The total area of the Republic of Moldova is 33,843.5 km^{2} [according to the Moldova.md]. The de jure area, accepted by the Moldovan government and the Tiraspol authorities for Transnistria, is 3,524.4 km^{2} and the main territory is 30,319.1 km^{2} [according to the BNS]. The de facto area administered by Transnistria is 3,719.2 km^{2} [according to the DeepStateMap.Live], while the area claimed by Transnistria is 4,163 km^{2}.)

Population
  - January 2026 estimate: 2,365,645 (Note: Excludes data for Transnistria) (140th)
  - 2024 census: 2,409,207
  - Density: 78/km^{2} (202.0/sq mi)
- GDP (PPP): 2026 estimate
  - Total: ▲$49.567 billion (135th)
  - Per capita: ▲$21,182 (93rd)
- GDP (nominal): 2026 estimate
  - Total: ▲$22.223 billion (130th)
  - Per capita: ▲$9,497 (89th)
- Gini (2021): ▼25.7 low inequality
- HDI (2023): ▲0.785 high (86th)
- Currency: Moldovan leu (MDL)
- Time zone: UTC+2 (EET)
  - Summer (DST): UTC+3 (EEST)
- Calling code: +373
- ISO 3166 code: MD
- Internet TLD: .md
- Website www.moldova.md

Moldova, (Note: /mɒlˈdoʊvə/ mol-DOH-və, sometimes UK: /ˈmɒldəvə/ MOL-də-və; Romanian pronunciation: [molˈdova]) officially the Republic of Moldova, (Note: Romanian: Republica Moldova) is a landlocked country in Eastern Europe, with an area of 33,843 km^{2} (13,067 sq mi) and a population of 2.38 million. Moldova is bordered by Romania to the west and Ukraine to the north, east, and south. The unrecognised breakaway state of Transnistria lies across the Dniester river on the country's eastern border with Ukraine. Moldova is a parliamentary democratic republic with its capital in Chișinău, the country's largest city and main cultural and commercial centre.

Most of Moldovan territory was a part of the Principality of Moldavia from the 14th century until 1812, when it was ceded to the Russian Empire by the Ottoman Empire (to which Moldavia was a vassal state) and became known as Bessarabia. In 1856, southern Bessarabia was returned to Moldavia, which three years later united with Wallachia to form Romania. Still, Russian rule was restored over the entire region in 1878. During the 1917 Russian Revolution, Bessarabia briefly became an autonomous state within the Russian Republic. In February 1918, it declared independence and then integrated into Romania later that year following a vote of its assembly. The decision was disputed by Soviet Russia, which in 1924 established, within the Ukrainian SSR, a Moldavian autonomous republic on partially Moldovan-inhabited territories to the east of Bessarabia. In 1940, as a consequence of the Molotov–Ribbentrop Pact, Romania was compelled to cede Bessarabia and Northern Bukovina to the Soviet Union, leading to the creation of the Moldavian Soviet Socialist Republic (Moldavian SSR).

On 27 August 1991, as the dissolution of the Soviet Union was underway, the Moldavian SSR declared independence and took the name Moldova. However, the strip of Moldovan territory on the east bank of the Dniester has been under the de facto control of the breakaway government of Transnistria since 1990. The constitution of Moldova was adopted in 1994, and the country became a parliamentary republic. The president is head of state and the prime minister is head of government. Under the presidency of Maia Sandu, elected in 2020 on a pro-Western and anti-corruption ticket, Moldova has pursued membership in the European Union, and was granted candidate status in June 2022. Accession talks to the EU began on 13 December 2023. Sandu has suggested an end to Moldova's constitutional commitment to military neutrality in favour of a closer alliance with NATO. She strongly condemned Russia's invasion of neighbouring Ukraine.

Moldova is a constitutional republic with a unicameral parliamentary government. The economy is emerging and upper middle income, with a high Human Development Index. It primarily exports agriculture, apparel, and sports equipment. Moldova is a member of multiple international organizations, including the United Nations, World Bank, and World Trade Organization. Moldova was granted candidate status in the European Union in June 2022.

== Etymology ==
The name Moldova is derived from the Moldova River; the valley of this river served as a political centre at the time of the foundation of the Principality of Moldavia in 1359. The origin of the name of the river remains unclear. According to a legend recounted by Moldavian chroniclers Dimitrie Cantemir and Grigore Ureche, Prince Dragoș named the river after hunting aurochs: following the chase, the prince's exhausted hound Molda (Seva) drowned in the river. The dog's name, given to the river, extended to the principality.

For a short time in the 1990s, at the founding of the Commonwealth of Independent States, the name of the Republic of Moldova was also spelled Moldavia. After the dissolution of the Soviet Union, the country began to use the Romanian name, Moldova. Officially, the name Republic of Moldova is designated by the United Nations.

== History ==
The history of Moldova spans prehistoric cultures, ancient and medieval empires, and periods of foreign rule and modern independence.

Evidence of human habitation goes back 800,000–1.2 million years, with significant developments in agriculture, pottery, and settlement during the Neolithic and Bronze Ages. In antiquity, Moldova's location made it a crossroads for invasions by the Scythians, Goths, Huns, and other tribes, followed by periods of Roman and Byzantine control.

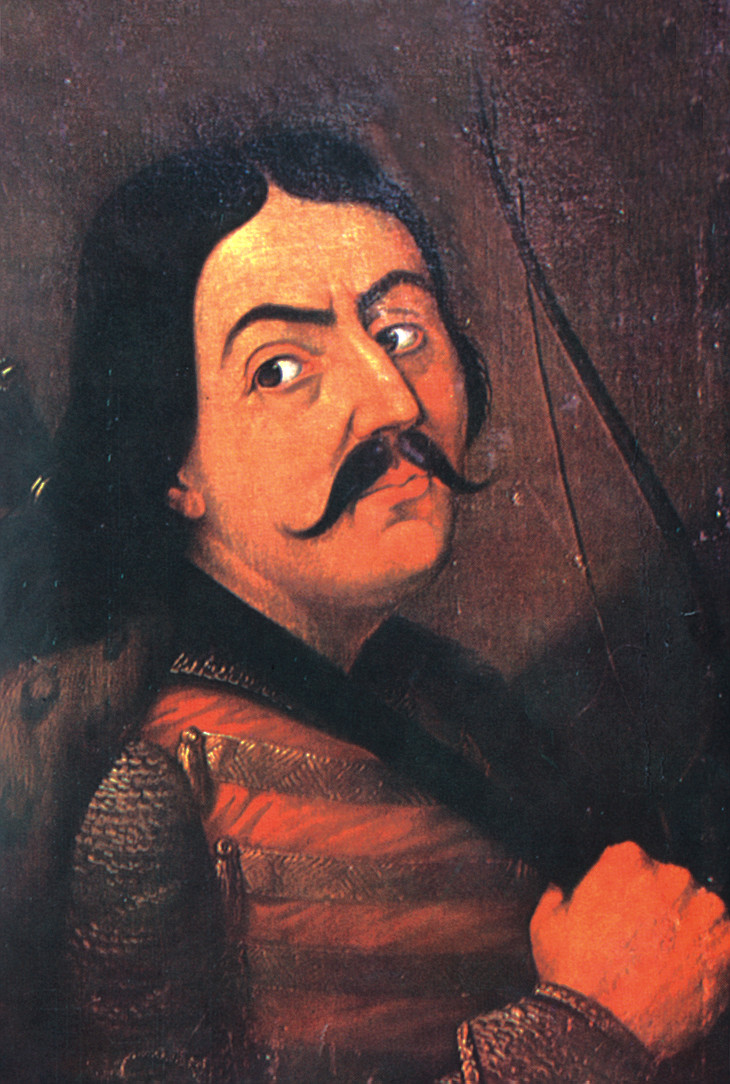
Dragoș, founder of the Principality of Moldavia, 19th-century depiction

The medieval Principality of Moldavia emerged in the 1350s and was the medieval precursor of modern Moldova and Romania. It reached prominence under rulers like Stephen the Great before becoming a vassal state of the Ottoman Empire from 1538, until the 19th century.

In 1812, following one of several Russian–Turkish wars, the eastern half of the principality, Bessarabia, was annexed by the Russian Empire, marking the beginning of Russian influence in the region. In 1918, Bessarabia briefly became independent as the Moldavian Democratic Republic and, following the decision of the Parliament (Sfatul Țării), united with Romania. During the Second World War it was occupied by the Soviet Union which reclaimed it from Romania. It joined the Union in 1940 as the Moldavian SSR. During this period, policies of Russification and economic transformation deeply influenced the region.

The dissolution of the USSR in 1991 led to declared independence, followed by the Transnistria War in 1992, a conflict that left the Transnistrian region as a de facto independent state. Moldova continues to navigate a complex relationship between pro-Western and pro-Russian factions. In recent years, it has pursued closer ties with the European Union, submitting a formal membership application in 2022.

In the November 2020 presidential election, the pro-European opposition candidate Maia Sandu was elected as the new president of the republic, becoming the first woman elected president of Moldova. In the November 2024 presidential election, President Maia Sandu was re-elected with 55% of the vote in the run-off.

== Geography ==
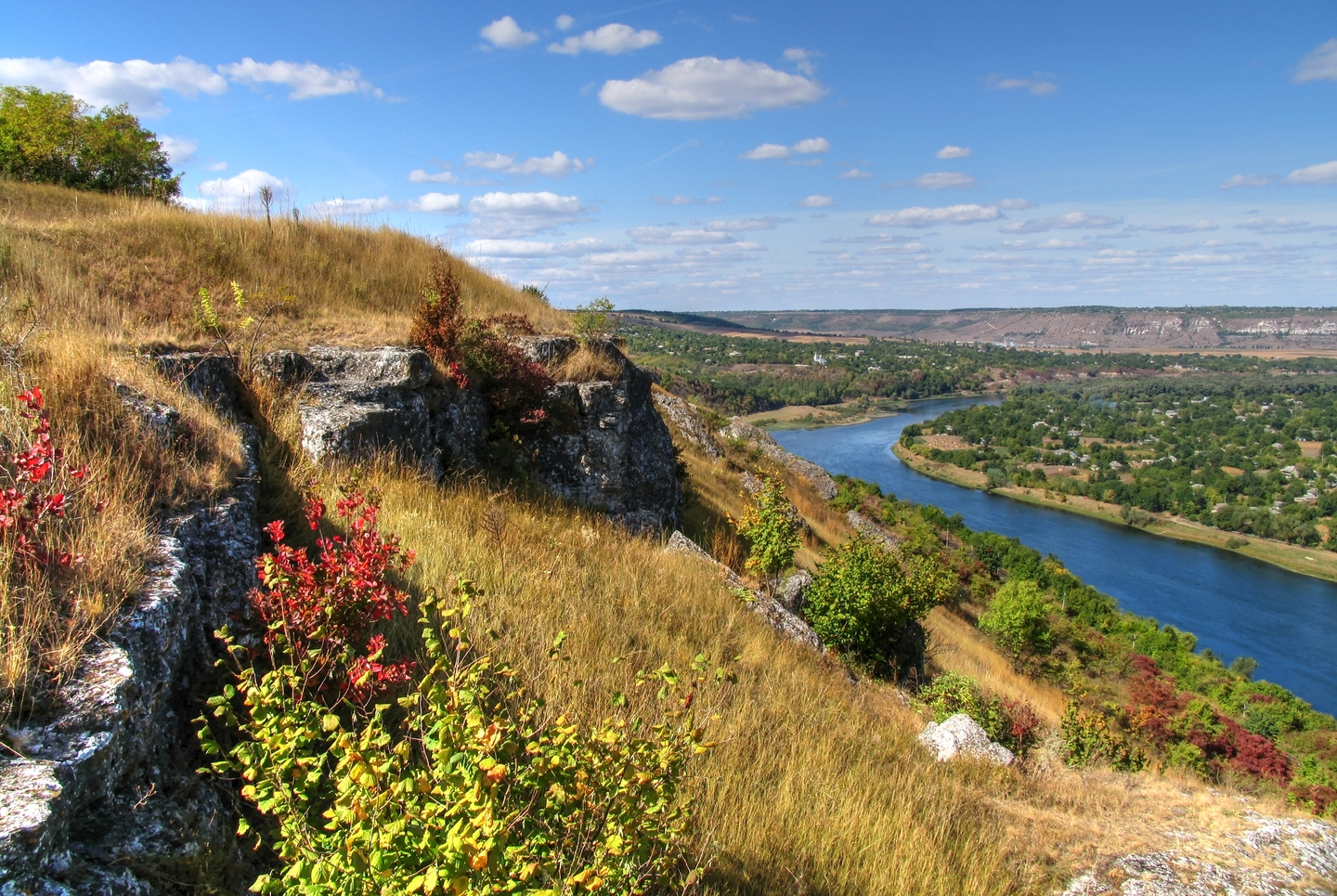
Scenery in Moldova, with Nistru River (Dniester)

Moldova is a landlocked country situated in Eastern Europe, on the northeastern corner of the Balkans in the Black Sea Basin, between latitudes 45° and 49° N, and mostly between meridians 26° and 30° E (a small area lies east of 30°). The country lies to the east of the Carpathian Mountains and is bordered by Romania to its west and by Ukraine to its north, east, and south. The total length of the national boundaries is 1,389 km, including 939 km with Ukraine and 450 km with Romania. The country is separated from Romania on the west by the Prut river and on the east from Ukraine by the Dniester river. The total land area is 33,843.5 km^{2} (13,067.0 sq mi), of which 960 km^{2} (370 sq mi) is water. The largest part of the country (around 88% of the area) lies in the Bessarabia region, while a narrow strip in the east is located in the unrecognised breakaway state of Transnistria on the eastern bank of the Dniester.

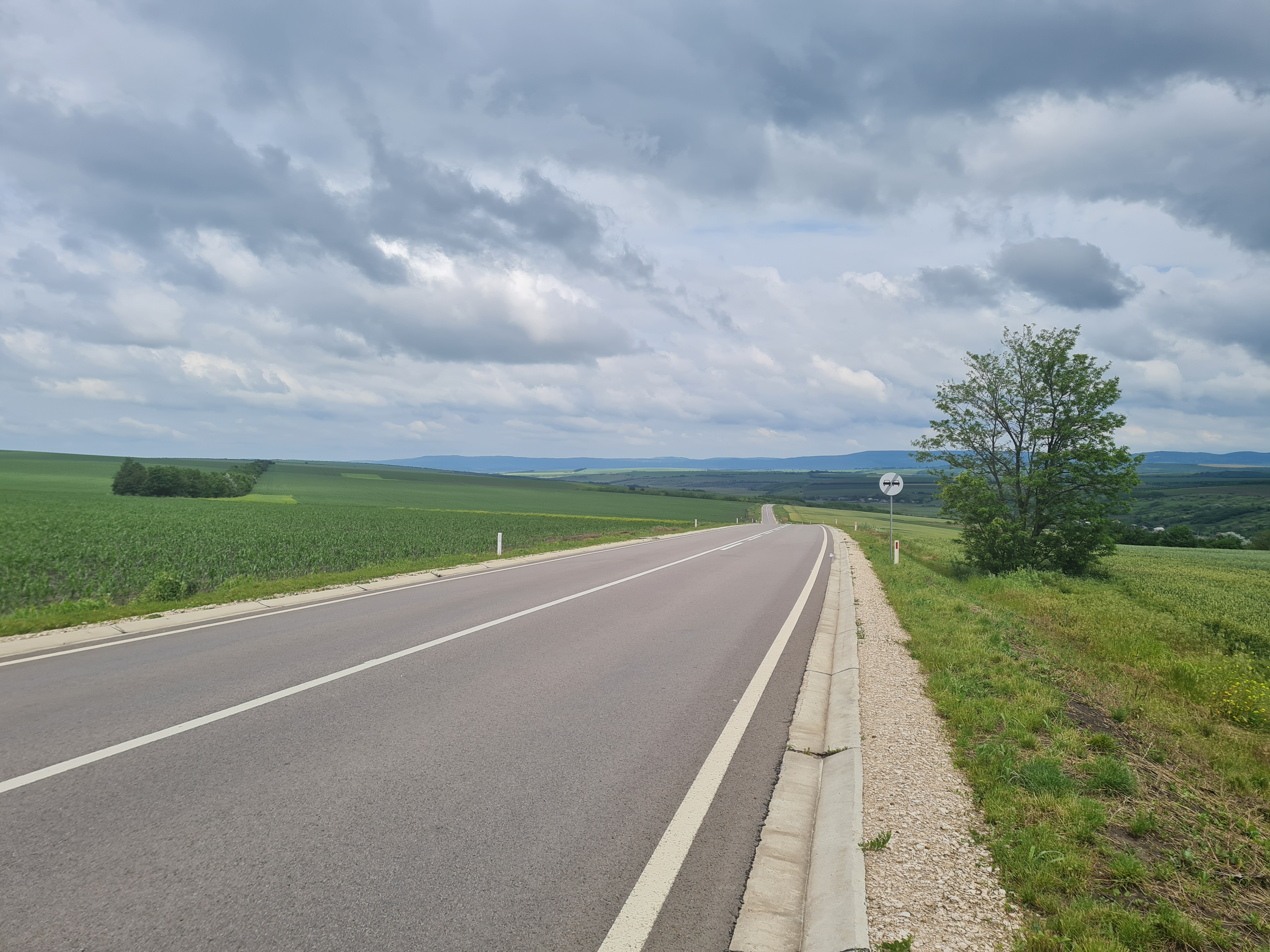
Moldovan landscape in the Ungheni District

Although the country is technically landlocked, in 1999 Moldova acquired from Ukraine (in exchange for ceding a stretch of contested road in the east of the country) a 0.45 kilometer river frontage to the Danube, on the confluence of the Danube and Prut rivers. This frontage has transformed the old village of Giurgiulești (in the extreme south-west of the country) into a river port, providing Moldova access to international waters via the Danube and the Black Sea. The Dniester river, which rises in Ukraine near the city of Drohobych, passes through Moldova, separating the main territory from its unrecognised breakaway region Transnistria, and empties into the Black Sea in Ukraine. At its closest point, Moldova is separated from the Dniester Liman, an estuary of the Black Sea, by only 3 km of Ukrainian territory.

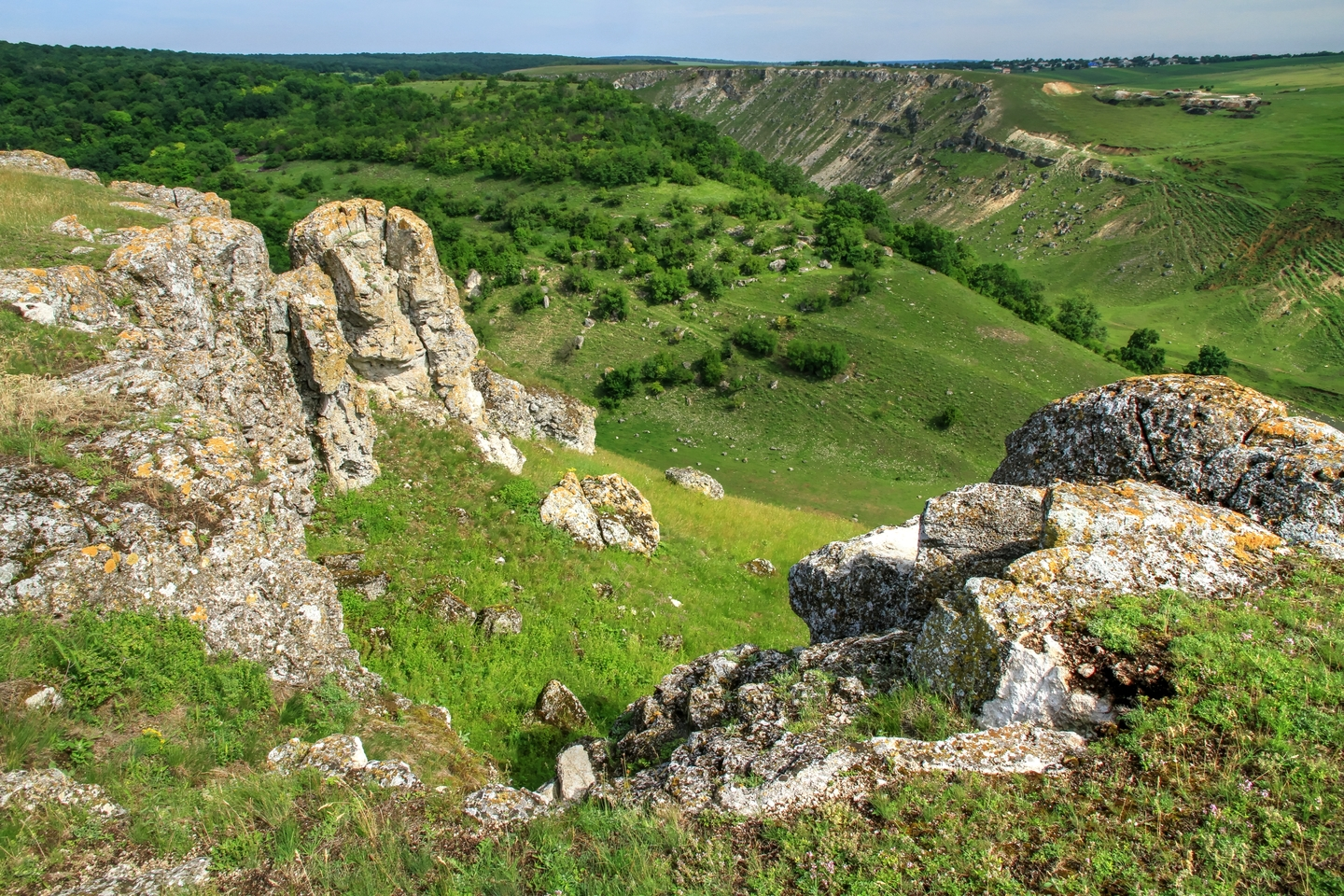
La Castel landscape reserve near Gordinești, Edineț District

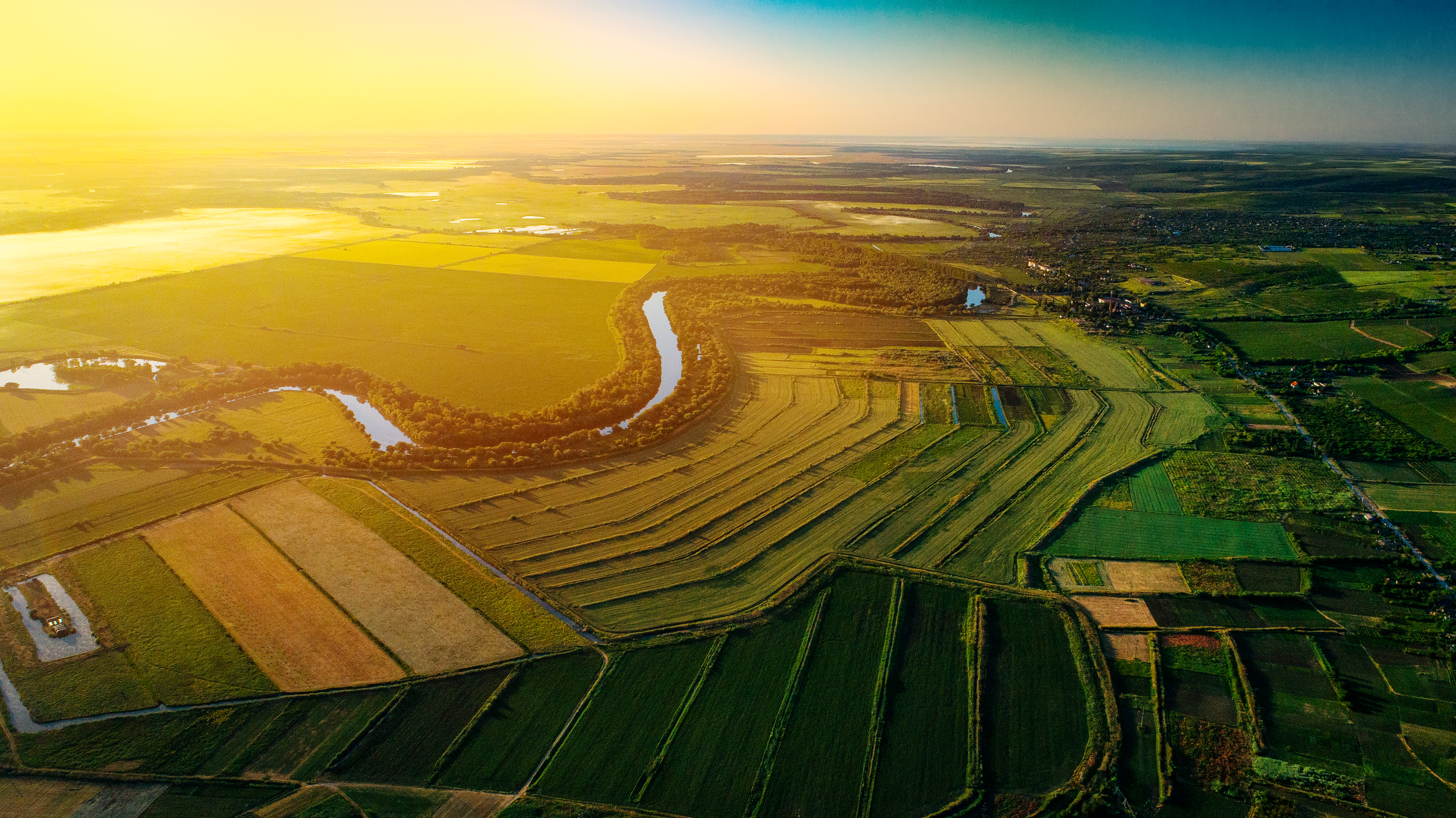
Nistru (Dniester) River in south of Moldova

While most of the country is hilly, elevations never exceed 430 m (1,410 ft), the highest point being the Bălănești Hill. Moldova's hills are part of the Moldavian Plateau, which geologically originate from the Carpathian Mountains. Its subdivisions in Moldova include the Dniester Hills (Northern Moldavian Hills and Dniester Ridge), the Moldavian Plain (Middle Prut Valley and Bălți Steppe), and the Central Moldavian Plateau (Ciuluc-Soloneț Hills, Cornești Hills—Codri Massive, "Codri" meaning "forests"—Lower Dniester Hills, Lower Prut Valley, and Tigheci Hills). In the south, the country has a small flatland, the Bugeac Plain. The territory of Moldova east of the river Dniester is split between parts of the Podolian Plateau, and parts of the Eurasian Steppe. Moldova's exceptionally rich Chernozem soil covers around three-quarters of the country's land area.

Moldova's capital and largest city is Chișinău, with approximately a third of the country's population residing in its metro area. Chișinău is Moldova's main industrial and commercial centre, and is located in the middle of the country, on the river Bîc, a tributary of the Dniester. Moldova's second-largest city is Tiraspol, which lies on the eastern bank of the Dniester and is the capital of the unrecognised breakaway region of Transnistria. The country's third-largest city is Bălți, often referred to as the 'northern capital'. It is situated 127 kilometres (79 miles) north of the capital Chișinău, and is located on the river Răut, a tributary of the Dniester, on hilly terrain in the Bălți steppe. Comrat is the administrative centre of the autonomous region of Gagauzia.

=== Climate ===
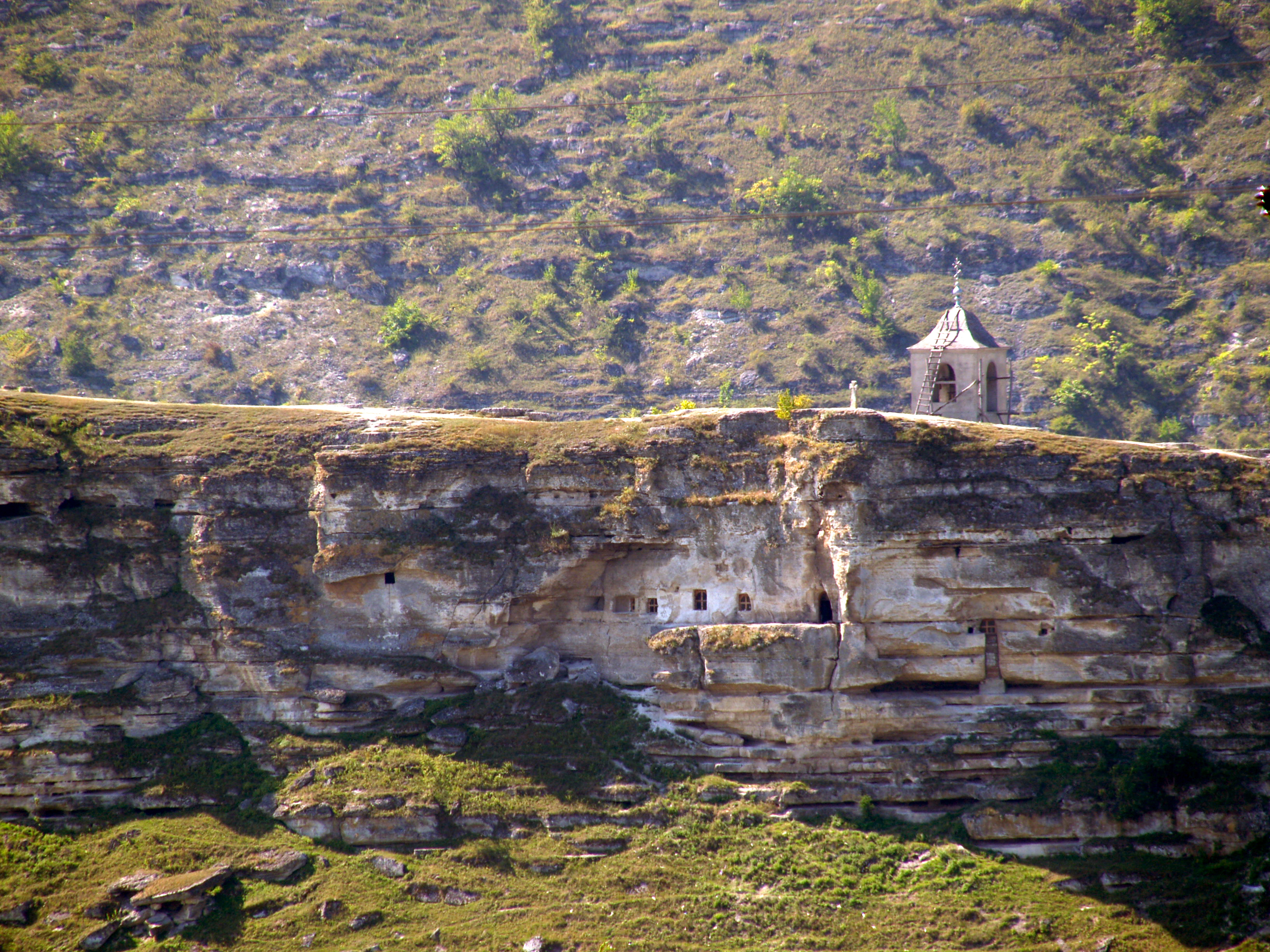
Cave churches at Old Orhei, part of the only national park in the country

Moldova has a climate which is moderately continental; its proximity to the Black Sea leads to the climate being mildly cold in the autumn and winter and relatively cool in the spring and summer.

The summers are warm and long, with temperatures averaging about 20 °C (68 °F) and the winters are relatively mild and dry, with January temperatures averaging −4 °C (25 °F). Annual rainfall, which ranges from around 600 mm (24 in) in the north to 400 mm (16 in) in the south, can vary greatly; long dry spells are not unusual. The heaviest rainfall occurs in early summer and again in October; heavy showers and thunderstorms are common. Because of the irregular terrain, heavy summer rains often cause erosion and river silting.

The highest temperature ever recorded in Moldova was 42.4 °C (108.3 °F) on 7 August 2012 in Fălești. The lowest temperature ever recorded was −35.5 °C (−31.9 °F) on 20 January 1963 in Brătușeni, Edineț county.

Average daily maximum and minimum temperatures for the three largest cities in Moldova
Location	July (°C)	July (°F)	January (°C)	January (°F)
Chișinău	27/17	81/63	1/−4	33/24
Tiraspol	27/15	81/60	1/−6	33/21
Bălți	26/14	79/58	−0/−7	31/18

=== Biodiversity ===
Phytogeographically, Moldova is split between the East European Plain and the Pontic–Caspian steppe of the Circumboreal Region within the Boreal Kingdom. It is home to three terrestrial ecoregions: Central European mixed forests, East European forest steppe, and Pontic steppe. Forests currently cover only 11% of Moldova, though the state is making efforts to increase their range. It had a 2019 Forest Landscape Integrity Index mean score of 2.2/10, ranking it 158th globally out of 172 countries. Game animals, such as red deer, roe deer and wild boar can be found in these wooded areas.

Scientific reserves in Moldova
Name	Location	Established	Area
Codru Reserve	Strășeni	1971	5,177 hectares (52 km^{2})
Iagorlîc	Dubăsari	1988	836 hectares (8 km^{2})
Lower Prut	Cahul	1991	1,691 hectares (17 km^{2})
Plaiul Fagului	Ungheni	1992	5,642 hectares (56 km^{2})
Pădurea Domnească	Glodeni	1993	6,032 hectares (60 km^{2})

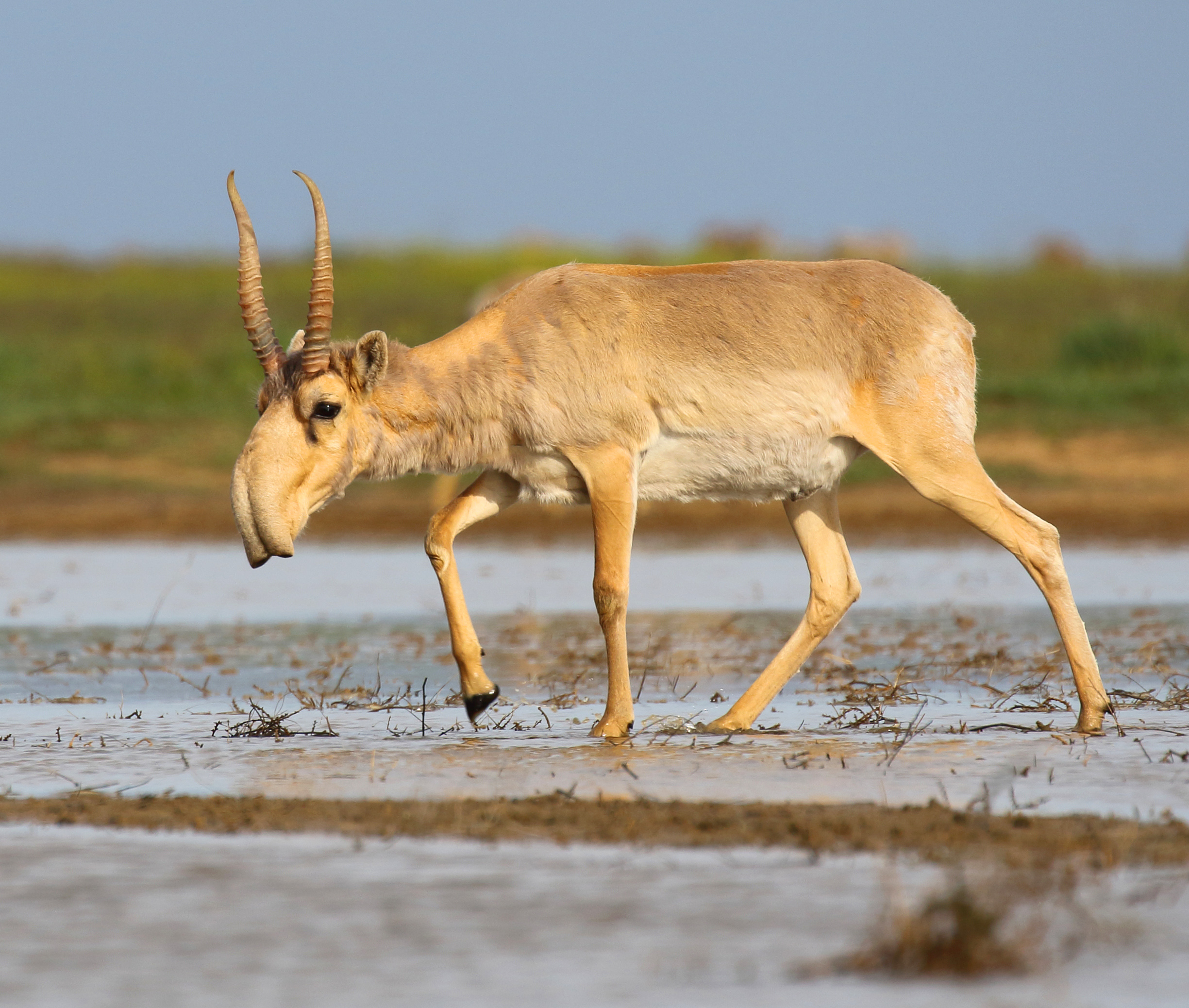
Noted for its vivid portrayal of the lower Nistru river (Dniester), Henryk Sienkiewicz's novel With Fire and Sword opens with a description of saigas as a way to highlight the story's exotic setting. Saigas are a near-threatened species that is now extinct in Moldova.

The environment of Moldova suffered extreme degradation during the Soviet period, when industrial and agricultural development proceeded without regard for environmental protection. Excessive use of pesticides resulted in heavily polluted topsoil, and industries lacked emission controls. Founded in 1990, the Ecological Movement of Moldova, a national, non-governmental, nonprofit organisation which is a member of the International Union for Conservation of Nature has been working to restore Moldova's damaged natural environment. The movement is national representative of the Centre "Naturopa" of the Council of Europe and United Nations Environment Programme of the United Nations.

The saiga antelope's range extended during the last glacial period from the British Isles to northern Canada. It survived in Moldova and Romania into the late 18th century. Deforestation, demographic pressure, and excessive hunting eradicated the native saiga herds. They were considered a characteristic animal of Scythia in antiquity. Historian Strabo referred to the saigas as the kolos, describing it as "between the deer and ram in size" which (understandably but wrongly) was believed to drink through its nose.

Another animal which was extinct in Moldova since the 18th century until recently was the European Wood Bison or wisent. The species was reintroduced with the arrival of three European bison from Białowieża Forest in Poland several days before Moldova's Independence Day on 27 August 2005. Moldova is currently interested in expanding their wisent population, and began talks with Belarus in 2019 regarding a bison exchange programme between the two countries.

== Government and politics ==
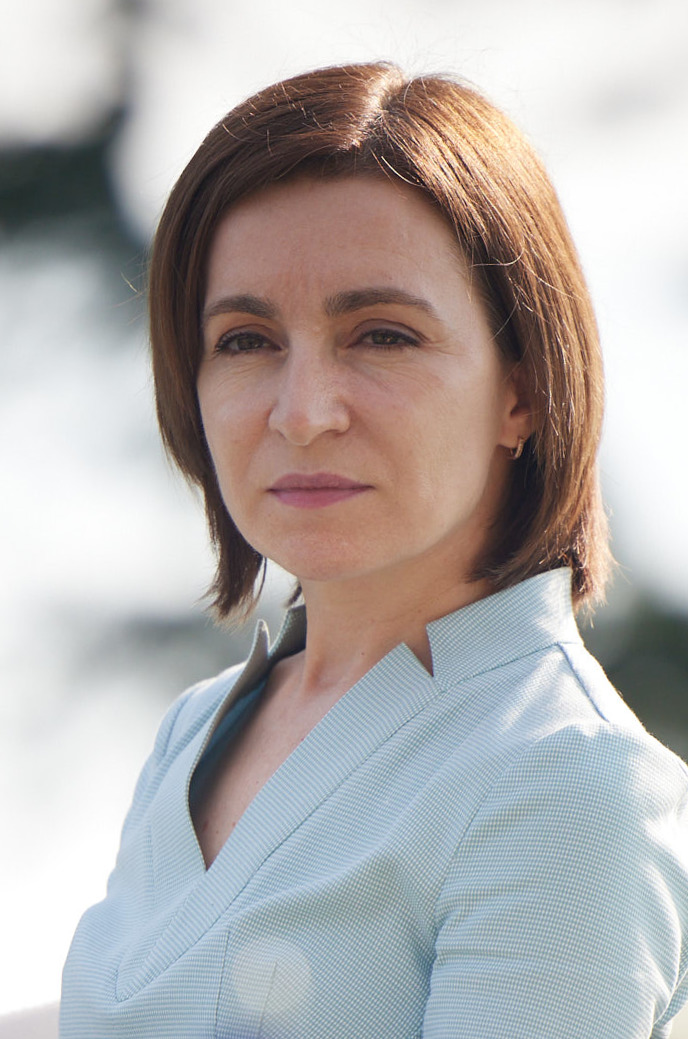
Maia Sandu
President

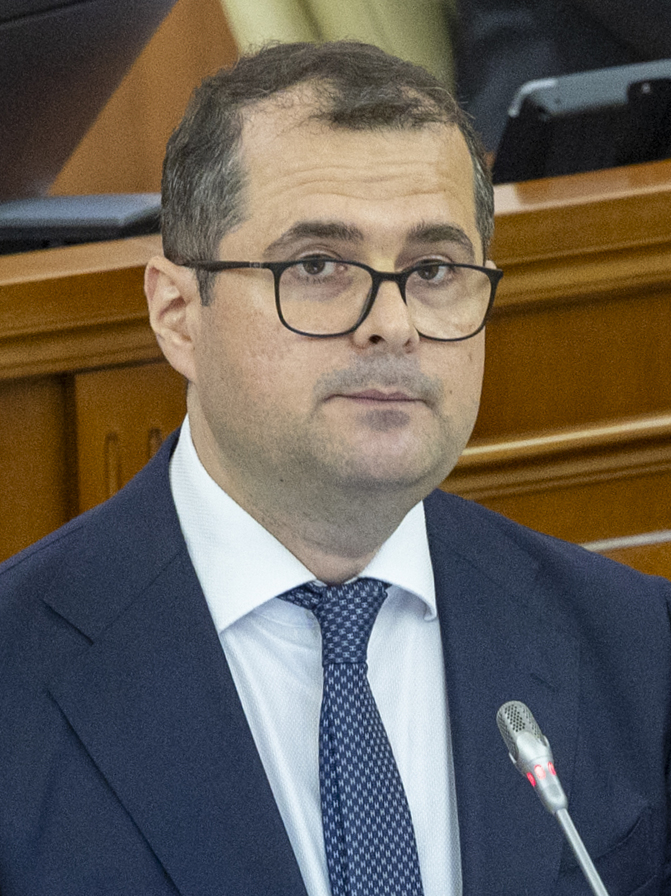
Vasile Tofan
Prime Minister

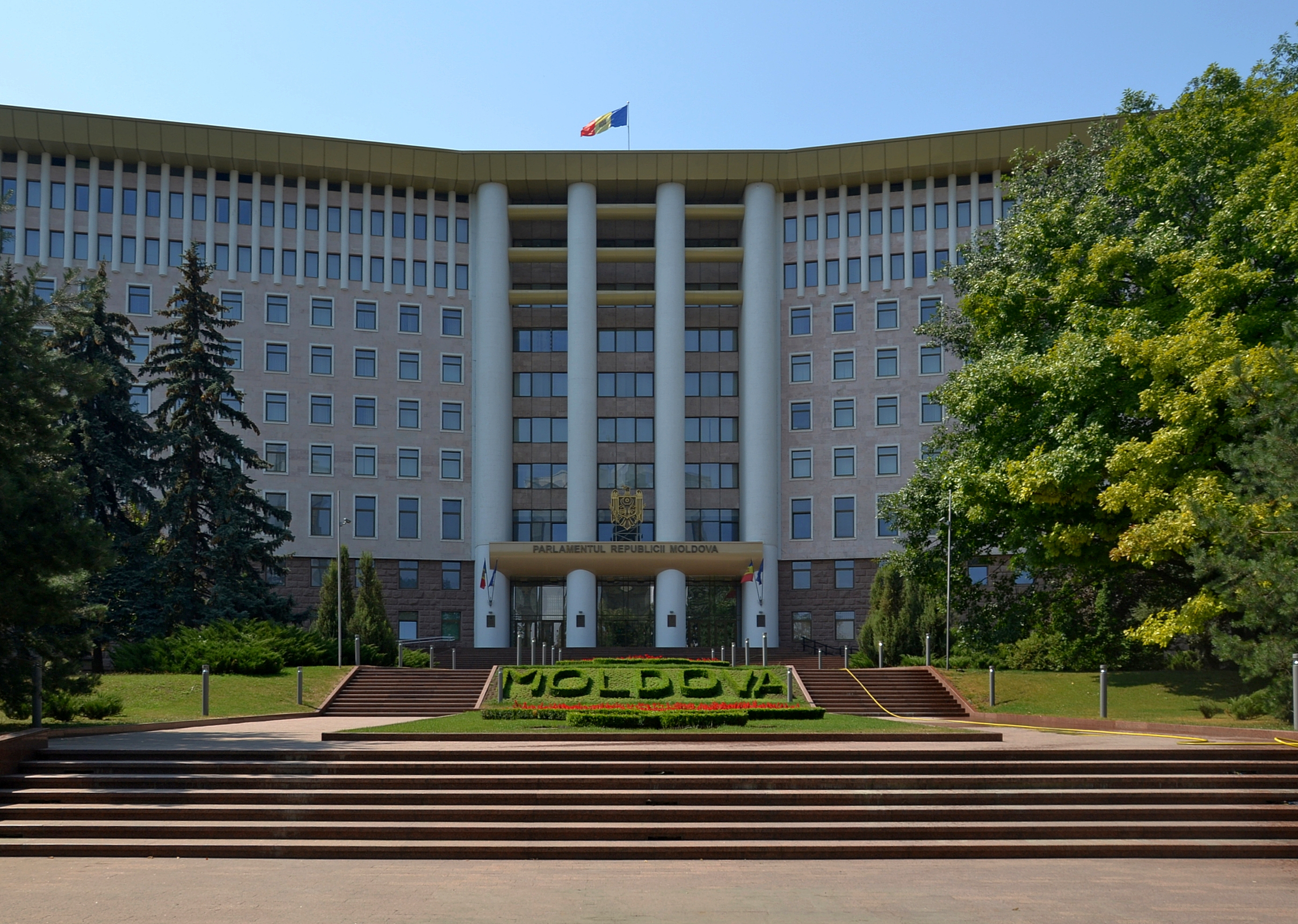
The Moldovan Parliament

The Republic of Moldova is a constitutional republic with a unicameral parliamentary system of government and competitive, multi-party elections. The constitution provides for executive and legislative branches as well as an independent judiciary and a clear separation of powers. The president is the head of state, is elected every four years, and can be re-elected once. The prime minister is the head of government, appointed by the president with parliament's support. The head of government in turn assembles a cabinet, subject to parliamentary approval. Legislative authority is vested in the unicameral Parliament of Moldova which has 101 seats and whose members are elected by popular vote on party lists every four years. The president's official residence is the Presidential Palace, Chișinău.

After the prime minister and government resigned in 2020 and the president and parliament failed to form a new government, early parliamentary elections were held in July 2021. According to Organization for Security and Cooperation in Europe observers, the 2021 parliamentary elections were well-administered and competitive, and fundamental freedoms were largely respected. The Party of Action and Solidarity won 63 seats in the 101-seat parliament, enough to form a single-party majority.

The 1994 Constitution of Moldova sets the framework for the government of the country. A parliamentary majority of at least two-thirds is required to amend the Constitution of Moldova, which cannot be revised in times of war or national emergency. Amendments to the Constitution affecting the state's sovereignty, independence, or unity can only be made after a majority of voters support the proposal in a referendum. Furthermore, no revision can be made to limit the fundamental rights of people enumerated in the Constitution. The 1994 constitution also establishes an independent Constitutional Court, composed of six judges (two appointed by the President, two by Parliament, and two by the Supreme Council of Magistrature), serving six-year terms, during which they are irremovable and not subordinate to any power. The court is invested with the power of judicial review over all acts of parliament, over presidential decrees, and over international treaties signed by the country.

The head of state is the President of Moldova, who between 2001 and 2015 was elected by the Moldovan Parliament, requiring the support of three-fifths of the deputies (at least 61 votes). This system was designed to decrease executive authority in favour of the legislature. Nevertheless, the Constitutional Court ruled on 4 March 2016 that this constitutional change adopted in 2000 regarding the presidential election was unconstitutional, thus reverting the election method of the president to a two-round direct election.

=== Administrative divisions ===

Moldova is divided into 32 districts (raioane, singular raion), three municipalities and two autonomous regions ("autonomous territorial units", Gagauzia and the Left Bank of the Dniester). The final status of Transnistria is disputed, as the central government does not control that territory. 10 other cities, including Comrat and Tiraspol, the administrative seats of the two autonomous territories, also have municipality status.

Moldova has 66 cities (towns), including 13 with municipality status, and 916 communes. Another 700 villages are too small to have a separate administration and are administratively part of either cities (41 of them) or communes (659). This structure makes for a total of 1,682 localities in Moldova, two of which are uninhabited.

The largest city in Moldova is Chișinău with a population of approx. 695,400 people. The second largest city is Tiraspol at 129,500, part of the unrecognised breakaway region of Transnistria, followed by Bălți (146,900) and Bender (91,000).

=== Foreign relations ===
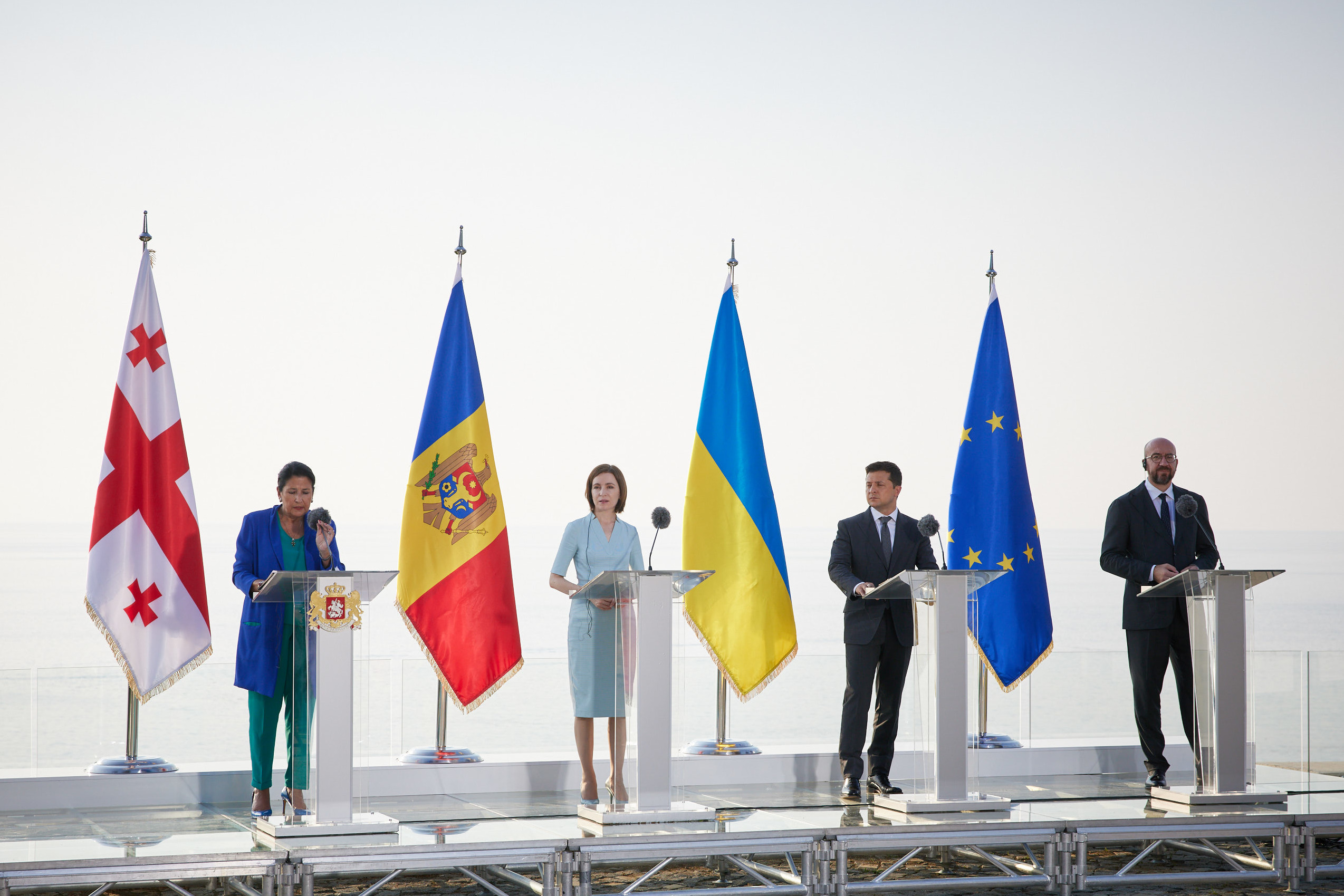
President of Georgia Salome Zourabichvili, President of Moldova Maia Sandu, President of Ukraine Volodymyr Zelenskyy and President of the European Council Charles Michel during the 2021 Batumi International Conference. In 2014, the EU signed Association Agreements with the three states.

After achieving independence from the Soviet Union, Moldova's foreign policy was designed with a view to establishing relations with other European countries, neutrality, and European Union integration. In May 1995, the country signed the CIS Interparliamentary Assembly Convention to become a member and was also admitted in July 1995 to the Council of Europe.

Moldova became a member state of the United Nations the Organization for Security and Co-operation in Europe (OSCE), the North Atlantic Cooperation Council, the World Bank, the International Monetary Fund and the European Bank for Reconstruction and Development in 1992. 1994 saw Moldova become a participant in NATO's Partnership for Peace programme. Moldova joined the Francophonie in 1996, the World Trade Organization in 2001, and the International Criminal Court in 2002.

In 2005, Moldova and the European Union established an action plan that sought to improve cooperation between Moldova and the union. At the end of 2005, the European Union Border Assistance Mission to Moldova and Ukraine (EUBAM) was established at the joint request of the presidents of Moldova and Ukraine. EUBAM assists the Moldovan and Ukrainian governments in approximating their border and customs procedures to EU standards and offers support in both countries' fight against cross-border crime.

After the 1990–1992 War of Transnistria, Moldova sought a peaceful resolution to the conflict in the Transnistria region by working with Romania, Ukraine, and Russia, calling for international mediation, and co-operating with the OSCE and UN fact-finding and observer missions. The foreign minister of Moldova, Andrei Stratan, repeatedly stated that the Russian troops stationed in the breakaway region were there against the will of the Moldovan government and called on them to leave "completely and unconditionally". In 2012, a security zone incident resulted in the death of a civilian, raising tensions with Russia.

In September 2010, the European Parliament approved a grant of €90 million to Moldova. The money was to supplement US$570 million in International Monetary Fund loans, World Bank and other bilateral support already granted to Moldova. In April 2010, Romania offered Moldova development aid worth of €100 million while the number of scholarships for Moldovan students doubled to 5,000. According to a lending agreement signed in February 2010, Poland provided US$15 million as a component of its support for Moldova in its European integration efforts. The first joint meeting of the Governments of Romania and Moldova, held in March 2012, concluded with several bilateral agreements in various fields. The European orientation "has been the policy of Moldova in recent years and this is the policy that must continue," Nicolae Timofti told lawmakers before his election in 2012.

On 29 November 2013, at a summit in Vilnius, Moldova signed an association agreement with the European Union dedicated to the European Union's 'Eastern Partnership' with ex-Soviet countries. The ex-Romanian President Traian Băsescu stated that Romania will make all efforts for Moldova to join the EU as soon as possible. Likewise, Traian Băsescu declared that the unification of Moldova and Romania is the next national project for Romania, as more than 75% of the population speaks Romanian.

==== Russia ====
A document written in 2021 by the Russia's FSB's Directorate for Cross-Border Cooperation, titled "Strategic objectives of the Russian Federation in the Republic of Moldova" sets out a 10-year plan to destabilise Moldova, using energy blackmail, and political/elite sources in Moldova that are favourable to Russia and the Orthodox Church. Russia denies any such plan.

Religious leaders play a role in shaping foreign policy. Since the fall of the Soviet Union, the Russian Government has frequently used its connections with the Russian Orthodox Church to block and stymie the integration of former Soviet states like Moldova into the West.

In February 2023, Russia canceled a 2012 decree underpinning Moldova's sovereignty. In May 2023, the Moldovan government announced the immediate suspension of its participation in the Commonwealth of Independent States and its intentions to ultimately withdraw from the organisation entirely. In July 2023, Moldova passed legislation removing it from membership in the CIS Interparliamentary Assembly. On 8 April 2026, president Sandu promulgated the laws denouncing the Belovezha Accords, the Alma-Ata Protocol and the CIS Charter. These three are the founding agreements of the CIS, which established Moldova's status as a member of the organization.

On 25 July 2023, the Moldovan government summoned the Russian ambassador Oleg Vasnetsov to Moldova after media reports of alleged spying devices on the rooftop of their embassy in Chişinău. On 26 July 2023, the Moldovan government expelled 45 Russian diplomats and embassy staff due to "hostile actions" intended to destabilise the Republic of Moldova, according to Foreign Minister Nicu Popescu. On 30 July, the Russian embassy announced that it would suspend consular appointments "for technical reasons".

The Moldovan Security and Intelligence Service (SIS) also ended all partnership agreements with Russia's FSB after sending official notifications to the authorities in Moscow. In September 2025, an investigation article by the BBC, revealed a secret Russian-backed network trying to disrupt the election in Moldova scheduled to 28 September. According to the BBC, sanctioned Russian groups recruited operatives on Telegram, then trained them to spread fake news. They posted pro-Russian content, attacked the pro-EU ruling party, and ran fake polls to question the results. The investigation linked the operation to fugitive oligarch Ilan Shor and the banned NGO Evrazia, noting that its content reached millions on TikTok and Facebook. Recruits used ChatGPT to create false content after filming opposition supporters. The investigation claims the funding comes from Moscow and is part of wider Kremlin efforts to destabillize Moldova.

==== European Union accession ====
In June 2022, Moldova became a recognised candidate for membership of the European Union.

Moldova has set 2030 as the target date for EU Accession.

Moldova signed the Association Agreement with the European Union in Brussels on 27 June 2014. The signing came after the accord was drafted in Vilnius in November 2013.

Moldova signed the membership application to join the EU on 3 March 2022. On 23 June 2022, Moldova was officially granted candidate status by EU leaders. The United Nations Development Programme is also providing assistance to Moldova in implementing the necessary reforms for full accession by 2030. The European Union's High Representative of the Union for Foreign Affairs and Security Policy Josep Borrell has confirmed that the pathway to accession does not depend upon a resolution of the Transnistria conflict.

On 27 June 2023, Moldova signed a comprehensive free trade agreement with the European Free Trade Association. On 28 June, the European Union announced a €1.6 billion support and investment programme for Moldova, as well as confirming reductions in the price of mobile data and voice roaming charges in Moldova by European and Moldovan telecoms operators, as well as Moldova joining the EU's joint gas purchase platform.

Formal accession talks began on 13 December 2023. A nationwide constitutional referendum was held in Moldova on 20 October 2024 on whether the country should amend the Constitution of Moldova to include the Moldovan citizens' wish for European Union membership, in order to make it harder for future governments to shift the country away from its pro-European trajectory. In the referendum, a narrow 50.17% voted "yes," with Maia Sandu alleging "unprecedented" outside interference. The referendum was seen as a test of Moldova's commitment to EU integration, amid claims of vote manipulation by criminal groups.

=== Military ===
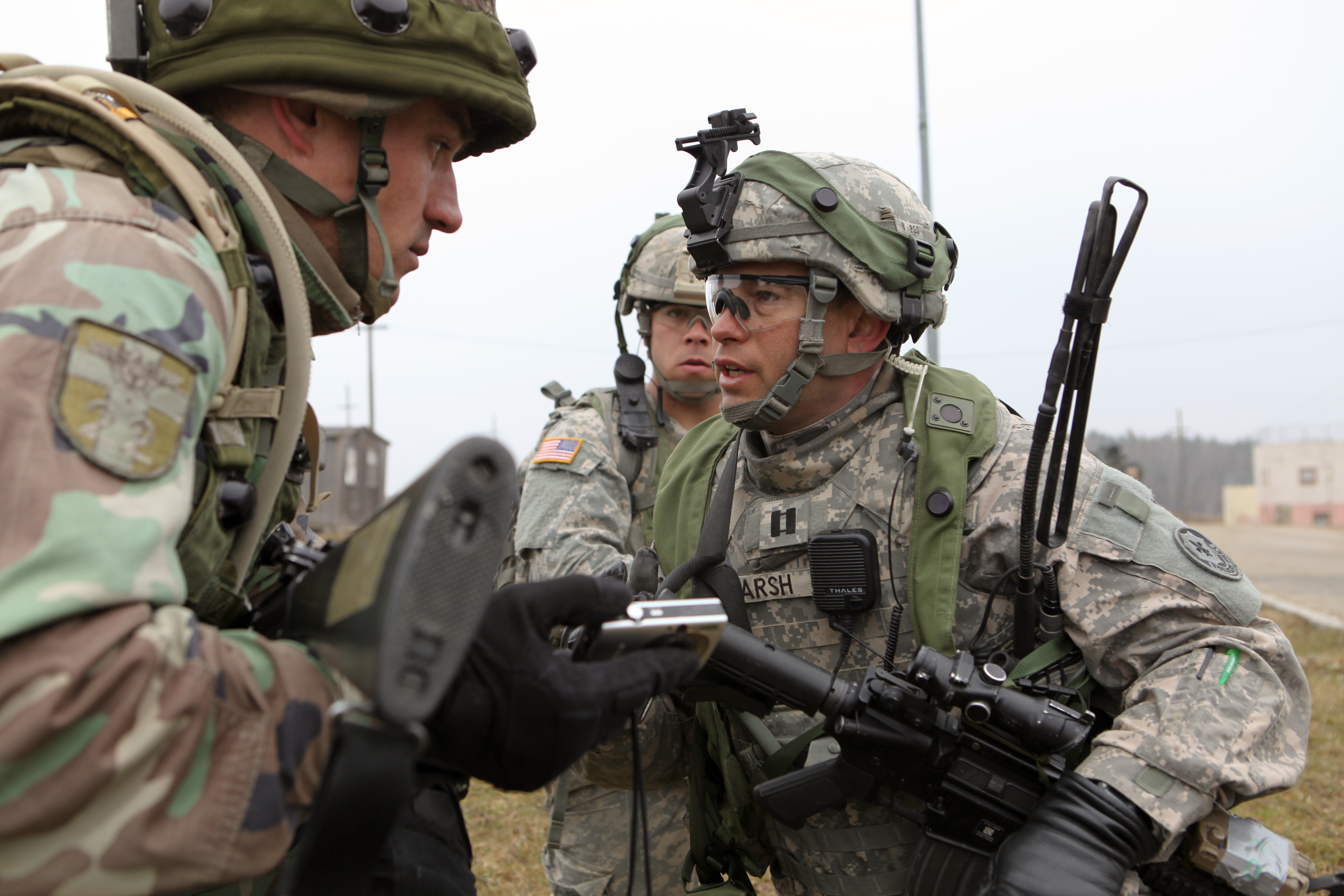
A soldier of the Moldovan Army at the Joint Multinational Readiness Centre in Hohenfels, Germany

The Moldovan armed forces consists of the Ground Forces and Air Force. Moldova maintains a standing army of just 6,500 soldiers, and spends just 0.4 percent of its GDP on defence, far behind its regional neighbours.

Moldova accepted all relevant arms control obligations of the former Soviet Union. On 30 October 1992, Moldova ratified the Treaty on Conventional Armed Forces in Europe, which establishes comprehensive limits on key categories of conventional military equipment and provides for the destruction of weapons in excess of those limits. The country acceded to the provisions of the nuclear Non-Proliferation Treaty in October 1994 in Washington, D.C. It does not have nuclear, biological, chemical or radiological weapons. Moldova joined the North Atlantic Treaty Organisation's Partnership for Peace on 16 March 1994.

Moldova is committed to a number of international and regional control of arms regulations such as the UN Firearms Protocol, Stability Pact Regional Implementation Plan, the UN Programme of Action (PoA), and the OSCE Documents on Stockpiles of Conventional Ammunition. Since declaring independence in 1991, Moldova has participated in UN peacekeeping missions in Liberia, Côte d'Ivoire, Sudan, and Georgia. On 12 November 2014, the US donated to Moldovan Armed Forces 39 Humvees and 10 trailers, with a value of US$700,000, to the 22nd Peacekeeping Battalion of the Moldovan National Army to "increase the capability of Moldovan peacekeeping contingents."

Moldova signed a military agreement with Romania to strengthen regional security in 2015. The agreement is part of Moldova's strategy to reform its military and cooperate with its neighbours.

Since 2022, the army has begun a process of modernisation, and has been provided with more than €87 million in support for the modernisation of the defence sector and the strengthening of security through the European Peace Facility. In October 2022, Defense Minister Anatolie Nosatii claimed that 90 percent of the country's military equipment is outdated and of Soviet origin, dating back to the 1960s and 1980s. In April 2023, Valeriu Mija, Secretary of State for Defence Policy and National Army Reform in the Defence Ministry, claimed that Moldova needed $275 million to modernise its armed forces, especially given Russia's invasion of Ukraine and the presence of 1,500 Russian soldiers in Transnistria. In June 2023, Poland also sent a transport of military equipment worth €8 million (including drones, laptops, explosive ordnance disposal equipment, and ultrasound equipment) to the Moldovan police to increase the country's internal security. Analysts at the Centre for European Policy Analysis have called for further western weapon donations.

=== Security ===
The European Union created a Partnership Mission in Moldova through its Common Security and Defence Policy on 24 April 2023. The mission seeks to support the government of Moldova in countering hybrid threats the country faces as a result of the 2022 Russian invasion of Ukraine.

A memorandum dated 29 March 2023 stated that the mission aims at "enhancing the resilience of Moldova's security sector in the area of crisis management as well as enhancing resilience to hybrid threats, including cybersecurity, and countering foreign information manipulation and interference". The initial mandate of the mission is expected to be for two years and it will be made up of up to 40 police and customs officers and judicial officials. Estonia, Latvia, Lithuania, Germany, Poland, Sweden, the Czech Republic, Portugal, Romania, and Denmark have all voiced support for the mission.

On 2 February 2023 Moldova passed a law introducing criminal penalties for separatism, including prison terms. The law continues with penalties for financing and inciting separatism, plotting against Moldova, and collecting and stealing information that could harm the country's sovereignty, independence and integrity.

=== Law enforcement and emergency services ===
The Moldovan police force (General Police Inspectorate) reports to the Ministry of Internal Affairs (MAI) and is the primary law enforcement body, responsible for internal security, public order, traffic, and criminal investigations. Several agencies responsible for border management, emergency situations, migration and asylum also report to the ministry. Civilian authorities maintained effective control over the security forces. The Moldovan Police are divided into state and municipal organisations. State police provide law enforcement throughout Moldova while municipal police operate at the local administrative level. National and municipal police forces often collaborate closely for law enforcement purposes. The Special Forces Brigade "Fulger" is a specialised combat-ready police force primarily responsible for tackling organised crime, serious violent crime, and hostage situations. They are subordinate to the General Police Inspectorate and therefore under strict civilian control.

There are also a number of more specialised police institutions including the Police Department of Chisinau Municipality and the General Directorate of Criminal Investigation. The Moldovan Border Police are responsible for border security. It was a military branch until 2012 when it was put under the control of the Ministry of Internal Affairs. According to The Law on Police Use of Force Worldwide, "Moldova does not regulate and restrict the use of firearms by law enforcement officials as international law requires. Police use of a firearm can only be lawful where necessary to confront an imminent threat of death or serious injury or a grave and proximate threat to life."

The Security and Intelligence Service (SIS) is a Moldovan state body specialised in ensuring national security by exercising all appropriate intelligence and counter-intelligence measures, such as: collecting, processing, checking and capitalising the information needed to identify, prevent and counteract any actions that according to law represent an internal or external threat to independence, sovereignty, unity, territorial integrity, constitutional order, democratic development, internal security of the state, society and citizens, the statehood of the Republic of Moldova, the stable functioning of vitally important branches of the national economy, both on the territory of the Republic of Moldova and abroad.

Emergency services in Moldova consist of emergency medical services, search and rescue units, and a state firefighting service. There are two hospitals in the capital city Chișinău, the primary being Medpark International Hospital, and general hospitals in Bălți, Briceni, Cahul, and Călărași. Moldova has a universal healthcare system through a mandatory health insurance scheme. Casa Mariorei, founded in 2002, is a domestic violence shelter in Chișinău which provides shelter, healthcare, legal advice, and psychosocial support for native Moldovan, immigrant, and refugee women.

=== Human rights ===
Freedom House ranked Moldova as a "partly free" country with a score of 62/100 in 2023. They summarised their finds as follows: "Moldova has a competitive electoral environment, and freedoms of assembly, speech, and religion are mostly protected. Nonetheless, pervasive corruption, links between major political figures and powerful economic interests, and critical deficiencies in the justice sector and the rule of law all continue to hamper democratic governance." According to Transparency International, Moldova's Corruption Perceptions Index improved to 39 points in 2022 from 34 in 2020. Reporters Without Borders improved Moldova's Press Freedom Index ranking from 89th in 2020 to 40th in 2022, while cautioning that "Moldova's media are diverse but extremely polarised, like the country itself, which is marked by political instability and excessive influence by oligarchs."

According to Amnesty International's 2022/23 report, "No visible progress was made in reducing instances of torture and other ill-treatment in detention. Impunity continued for past human rights violations by law enforcement agencies. New "temporary" restrictions on public assemblies were introduced. The rights of LGBTI people were not fully realised, leading to cases of harassment, discrimination and violence. Some refugee reception centres turned away religious and ethnic minority refugees. In the breakaway Transdniestria region, prosecution and imprisonment for peaceful dissent continued." On 18 June 2023, some 500 LGBT activists and supporters held a Pride parade in the capital city of Chișinău which for the first time needed no heavy police cordons to protect them from protesters largely linked to the Orthodox church.

According to Human Rights Report of the United States Department of State, released in 2022, "While authorities investigated reports of human rights abuses and corruption committed by officials, the process was slow and burdensome. During the year, authorities indicted and detained several former high-level officials including former President Igor Dodon, former member of parliament Vladimir Andronachi, Shor Party member of parliament Marina Tauber and former director of Moldovan Railways Anatolie Topala. None of these cases resulted in conviction by a court at year's end. Authorities took some steps to identify, investigate, and prosecute officials for human rights abuses, but progress was slow."

In a meeting with the European Union in October 2022, EU representatives "welcomed positive developments in Moldova such as the ratification of the Istanbul Convention on preventing and combating violence against women, the adoption of legislation on hate crime, and the ongoing work to reform the Electoral Code. It encouraged Moldovan authorities to address shortcomings identified by OSCE/ODIHR and the Venice Commission across all areas and ensure effective and continuous implementation of human rights legislation." The Office for Democratic Institutions and Human Rights' 2016 recommendations on hate crimes were "largely reflected in amendments to the Criminal Code adopted by the Moldovan Parliament and published on 3 June 2022", but the report notes that Moldovan law enforcement officers often fail to record the bias motivations behind hate crimes, and additionally recommended "developing its victim support system to ensure effective access to justice, assistance, and protection services for hate crime victims". In 2021, 8 hate crimes were recorded, 7 of which reached a successful conviction, with one going to prosecution but without a conviction.

== Economy ==
Annual growth of GDP for Moldova, Romania, and Ukraine, 1980 to 2028

The economy of Moldova is an emerging upper-middle income economy, with a high Human Development Index. Since the country gained independence from the Soviet Union in 1992, it has steadily transitioned to a market economy. According to the World Bank, despite a strong economic performance over the past two decades, Moldova remains among the poorest nations in Europe. Growth has remained relatively high since the 1990s, with low levels of unemployment and falling levels of poverty, but a combination of demographic factors, especially an ageing population and significant levels of emigration, and recent regional events, especially Russia's invasion of Ukraine, have posed serious economic challenges to the Moldovan economy, particularly due to inflation and rising energy prices. Productivity growth has remained poor, and a significant proportion of the population are reliant on government pensions and social assistance. Due to Moldova's historic reliance upon Russian oil and natural gas, the energy sector has posed a particular challenge to the country's economy.

Real GDP per capita development of Moldova, Romania, and Ukraine

GDP per capita has almost doubled from $2,749 (USD) in 2015 to $5,562 in 2022. Following the COVID-19 pandemic and subsequent lockdowns, annual GDP growth rebounded to 13.9% in 2021, before Russia's invasion of Ukraine, energy and refugee crises caused growth to collapse to −5.9%. As of 2022, unemployment remains low at 2.3%, but inflation had dramatically increased to 28.7% due to the energy crisis caused by the invasion. In recent years the country has received significant economic assistance from the European Union, IMF, and World Bank, particularly after Russia's invasion of Ukraine. The IMF predicts that in 2023 the economy will improve from a 1.5% contraction to a growth of 1.5%.

Moldova remains highly vulnerable to fluctuations in remittances from workers abroad (which constitute 25 percent of GDP), exports to the Commonwealth of Independent States (CIS) and European Union (EU) (88 per cent of total exports), and donor support (about 10 per cent of government spending). The main transmission channels through which adverse exogenous shocks could impact the Moldovan economy are remittances (also due to potentially returning migrants), external trade, and capital flows.

The economy's primary exports are agriculture, apparel, and sports equipments. In 2021, Moldova exported $140 million in wine and is the 21st largest exporter of wine in the world, with wine exports being the country's fifth largest export. With its 300 days of sunshine per year, the climate in Moldova is ideal for agriculture and particularly vineyards. The wine industry is a major economic sector, representing three percent of Moldova's GDP and eight percent of the country's total exports, according to government data. In 2021, the EU became the main purchaser of Moldovan wines. Information and Communication Technology (ICT) is one of the most promising economic sectors in Moldova, accounting for more than 10 percent of GDP. More than 2,000 students graduate with a degree in computing or a related field per year. IT companies export about 80 percent of their total production to the United States, the United Kingdom, France, Germany, the Netherlands, and Romania.

GDP per year (Source: World Bank)
Year	GDP (Billions in US dollars)
2017	9.52
2018	11.25
2019	11.74
2020	11.53
2021	13.69
2022	14.51

Imports per year (Source: World Bank)
Year	Imports (Billions in US dollars)
2017	5.37
2018	6.39
2019	6.61
2020	5.92
2021	7.91
2022	10.91

Exports per year (Source: World Bank)
Year	Exports (Billions in US dollars)
2017	3.12
2018	3.45
2019	3.66
2020	3.22
2021	4.20
2022	5.98

=== Energy ===
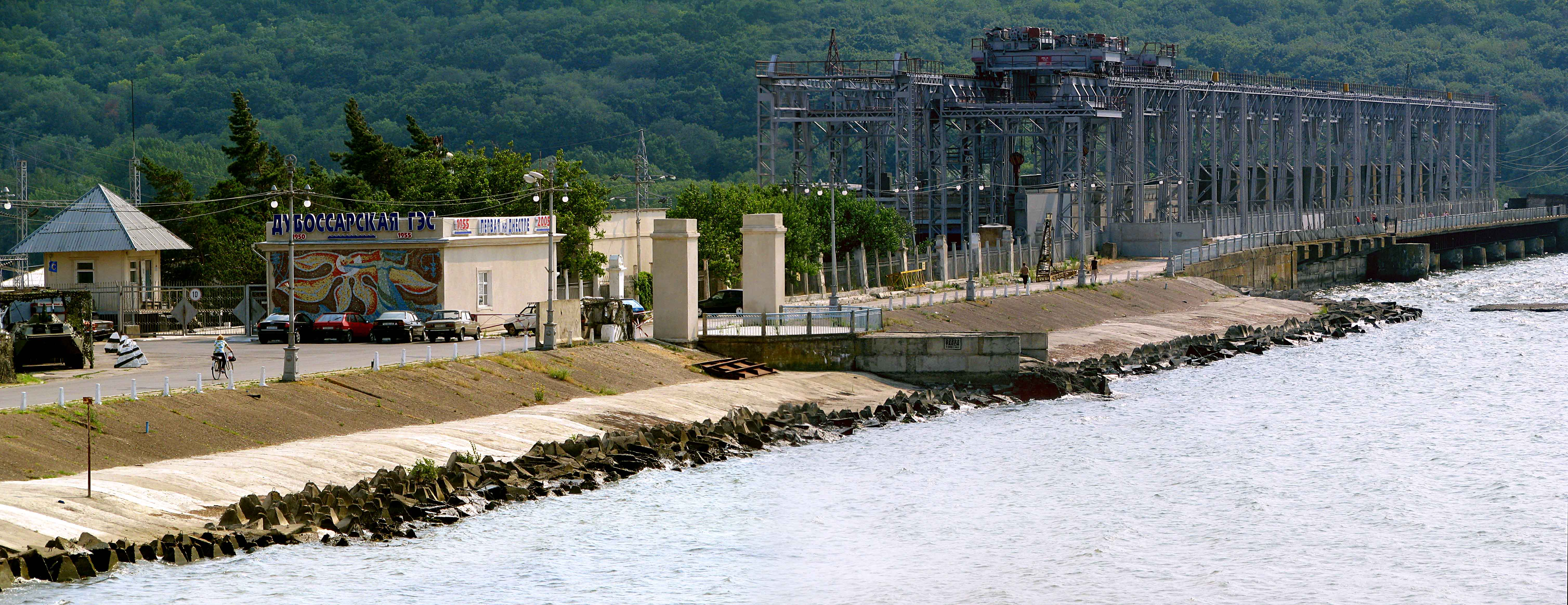
Dubăsari Reservoir

With few natural energy resources, Moldova imports almost all of its energy supplies. Fifty percent of Moldovagaz, the country's national energy company, is owned by Russian oil and natural gas supplier Gazprom, with the remaining 50% split between the Moldovan government (36.6%) and the unrecognised government of Transnistria (13.4%). Moldova's historic dependence on Russian energy is underscored by a debt of more than US$709 million to Gazprom as well as a further US$7 billion by Transnistria. Russia supplies the breakaway pro-Russian region with oil and natural gas without requiring them to pay, with the cost levied as debt against the Moldovan state as a form of economic warfare. The Moldovan government disputes the figures, and has identified more than US$100 million in fraudulent claims by Gazprom.

In August 2013, work began on a pipeline between Moldova and Romania that has now been completed and has broken Russia's monopoly on Moldova's gas supplies. Importing electricity from Romania began in 2022, thereby eliminating the need to buy electricity generated from Russian gas in Transnistria. Improved connectivity will be completed by 2025. As of June 2023, Moldova no longer imports oil or natural gas from Russia and has been granted access to the European Union's joint gas purchasing platform. Financial assistance was provided by the European Union, the World Bank, and the IMF in order to speed up this transition.

Moldova lacks domestic sources of fossil energy and must import substantial amounts of petroleum, coal, natural gas, and other energy resources. The primary energy supply in 2018 was about half natural gas, a quarter oil, and solid biomass at one-fifth.

Renewable energy has expanded rapidly, and Moldova is seeking to diversify its energy sources and cease purchasing from Russia.

=== Tourism ===
Moldova is one of the least visited countries in Europe, and tourism consequently plays a relatively minor role in the country's overall economy. Despite the impact of Russia's invasion of neighbouring Ukraine, Moldova saw more foreign visitors in the first quarter of 2022 than pre-pandemic, going from 31,000 non-resident tourists in 2019 to 36,100 in 2022. This still makes it one of the least-visited countries in Europe, however in recent years a number of Western media outlets have begun to highlight Moldova and its capital city Chișinău as an attractive tourism destination due to its picturesque natural landscapes, 300 days of sunshine per year, low prices, ancient wine culture, and mix of regional cultural influences. Tourism in Moldova has focused on the country's natural landscapes, historical sites, and historic wine tradition. The government promotes international tourism within the country through its Moldova Travel brand. Moldova is internationally connected by plane via Chișinău Eugen Doga International Airport, with direct flights to and from many European destinations, including Amsterdam Schiphol, Berlin Brandenburg, London Stansted, Paris–Charles de Gaulle, Tel Aviv's Ben Gurion Airport, Rome–Fiumicino Airport, Istanbul Airport, and Dubai International Airport. Rail links connect it via direct overnight trains to neighbouring Bucharest, Kyiv, Odesa, and formerly Moscow. Moldovan citizens also enjoy visa-free travel across the Schengen Area.

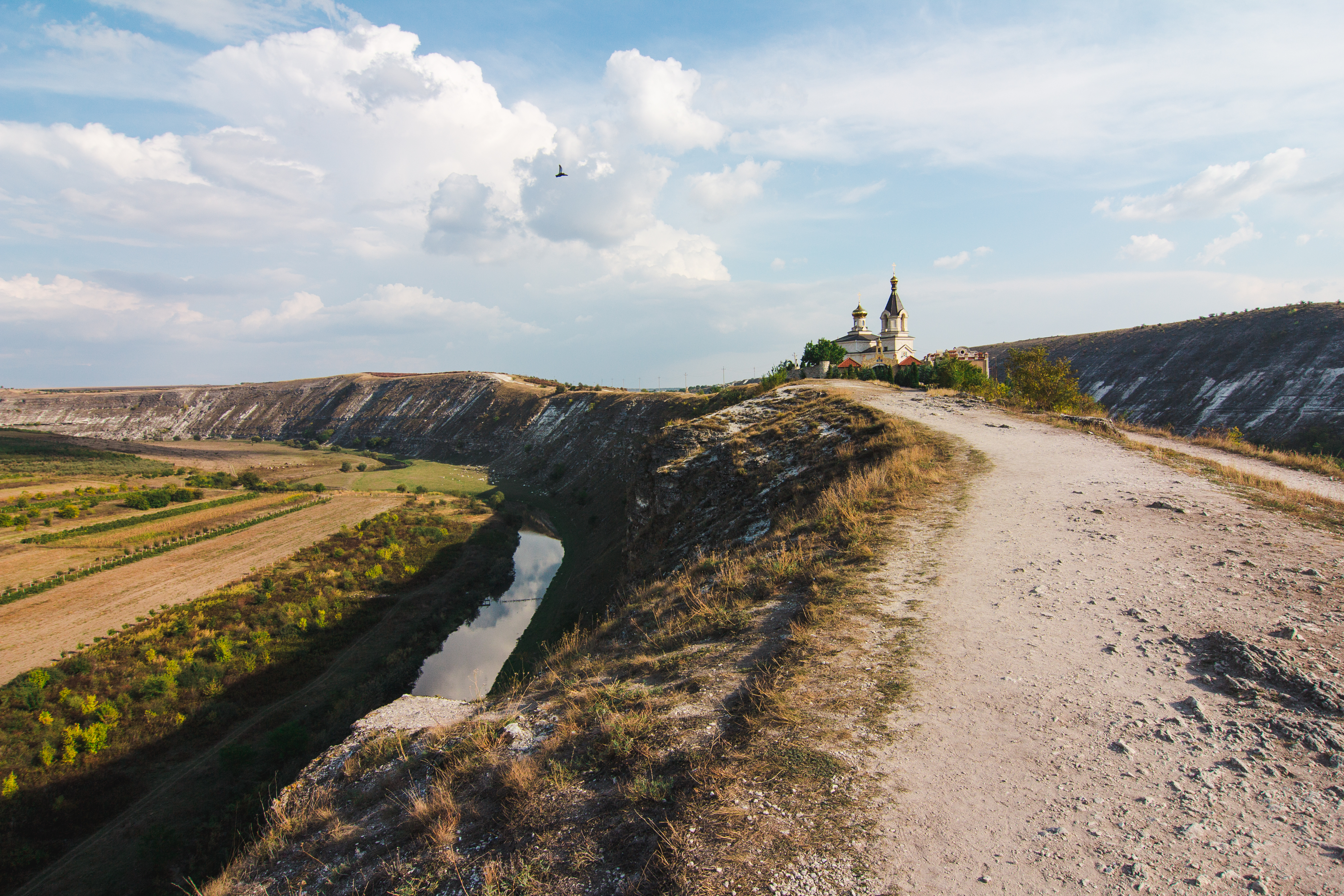
Orhei National Park

As a major exporter of wine with more than 142 wineries and the largest wine cellar in the world, vineyard tours are offered to tourists across the country. Major sites include the Cricova winery, whose wine cellar stretches more than 120 kilometres (75 miles); Castel Mimi, a 19th-century chateau with vineyards, a museum, art gallery, spa, hotel, and restaurant; and Mileștii Mici, which holds the world's largest collection of wine. As a country with a deep history of Eastern Orthodox Christianity, the country also has more than 50 monasteries and 700 churches. Among the most famous and well-visited are the Old Orhei Cave Monastery, carved into a cliff face in the 13th century and still in use today, and the 19th century Nativity Cathedral in the centre of Chișinău. UNESCO includes both the Old Orhei Archaeological Landscape, which features evidence of settlements dating back to at least the 12th century, and the typical Chernozem soil on the Bălți Steppe of Moldova (the most arable soil on the planet) on its Tentative List of World Heritage Sites. The capital city of Chișinău hosts most of the country's national museums, including the National Museum of Fine Arts, Moldova State University, Brancusi Gallery, the National Museum of History of Moldova with over 236,000 exhibits, as well as bustling markets in the north of the city, including the house where Alexander Pushkin once resided while in exile from the Russian Tsar, and which has since been turned into a museum. Every year on 3–4 October, the country celebrates National Wine Day, where wine producers open up their wineries to the general public and provide shuttle buses between locations.

=== Wine industry ===
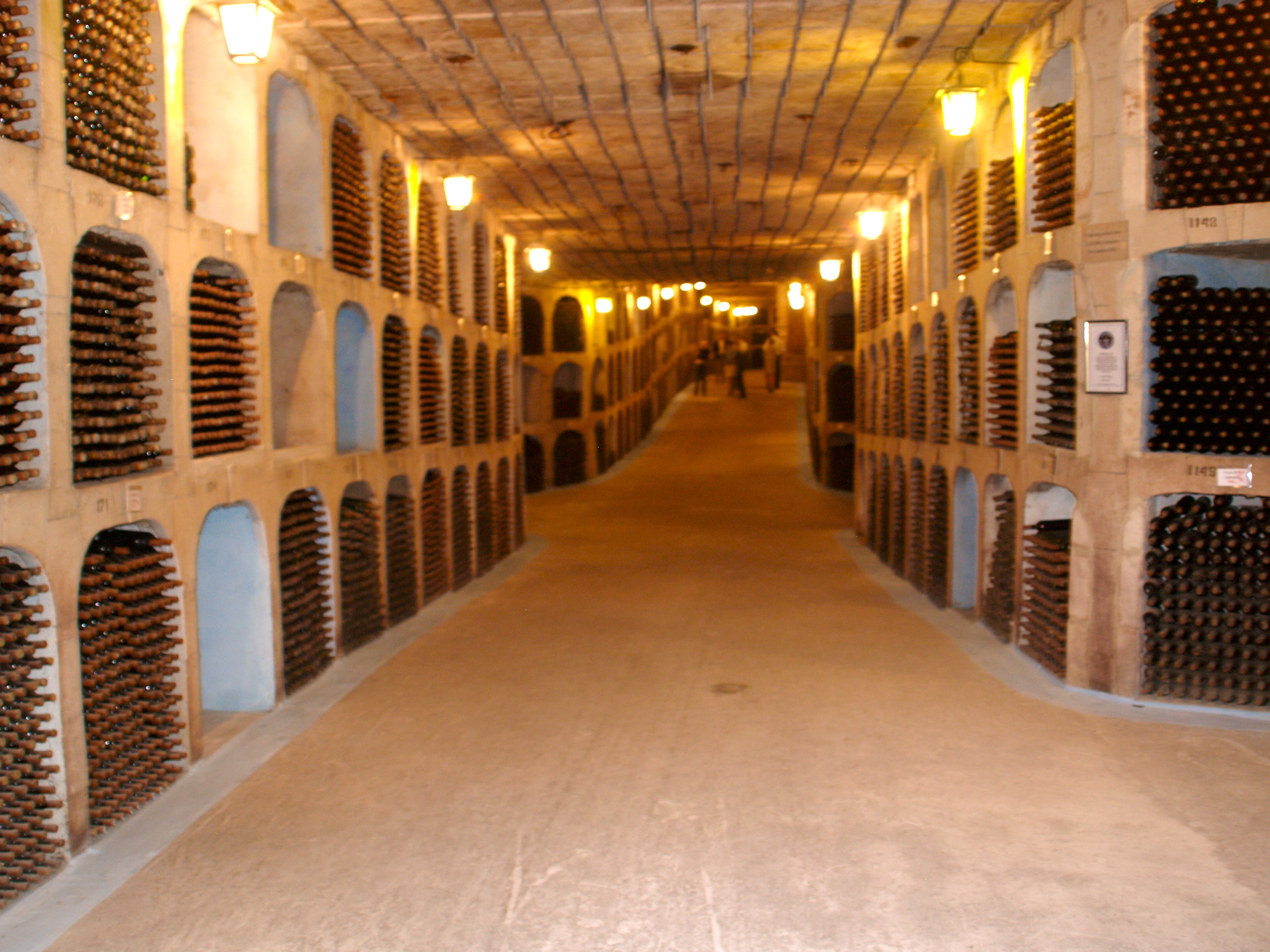
Mileștii Mici is home to the world's biggest wine cellar.

With its 300 days of sunshine per year, the climate in Moldova is ideal for agriculture and particularly vineyards. The wine industry is a major economic sector, representing three percent of Moldova's GDP and eight percent of the country's total exports, according to government data. Moldovan wine is being exported into over 70 states worldwide. Although Moldova is barely larger than Belgium, the country has 122,000 hectares of vineyards and is among the 20 largest producers in the world, according to a report by the International Organisation of Vine and Wine (OIV).

Before Russia's invasion of Ukraine and Moldova's pivot towards Europe, a majority of its wine exports went to Russia, but this has now changed: "Russia accounted for only 10 percent of Moldovan wine exports in 2021, down from 80 percent in the early 2000s, according to figures from the Moldovan Ministry of Agriculture." The EU liberalised its market for Moldovan wines and has signed a bilateral free trade deal with Moldova, with the result that in 2021 the country exported more than 120 million litres of wine to European countries, compared to 8.6 million litres to Russia.

Many families have their own recipes and grape varieties that have been passed down through the generations. There are 3 historical wine regions: Valul lui Traian (south west), Stefan Voda (south east) and Codru (centre), destined for the production of wines with protected geographic indication. Mileștii Mici is the home of the largest wine cellar in the world. It stretches for 200 km (120 mi) (though only 55 km (34 mi) is in use) and holds some two million or more bottles of wine. It has retained the Guinness World Record for largest wine cellar by number of bottles since 2005. The earliest wines in its collection date to 1969. Mimi Castle in the south east is a winery and architectural monument, which was built at the end of the 19th century in the village of Bulboaca in the district Anenii Noi, and is thought to be the first winery in Bessarabia. It has since also become a tourist complex with a museum, art gallery, hotel, spa, and wine tasting rooms.

=== Agriculture ===
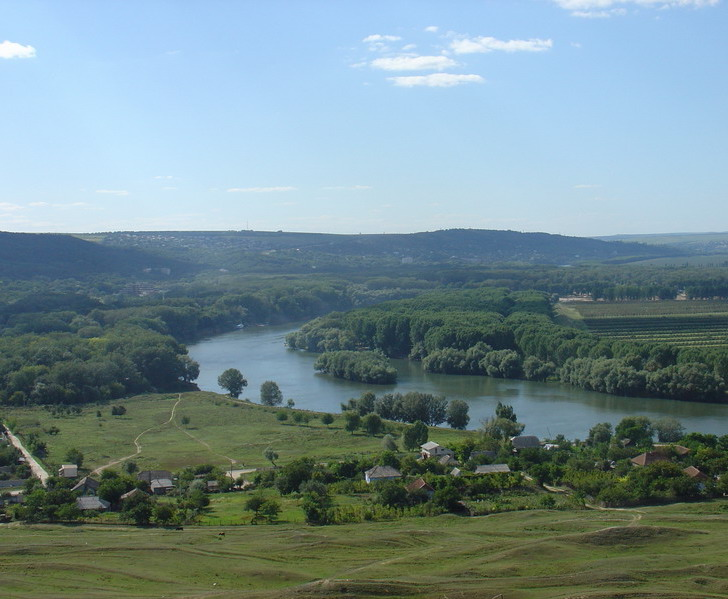
Agricultural land in Dniester, 2004

Moldova is an agrarian-industrial state, with agricultural land occupying 2,499,000 hectares in a total area of 3,384,600 hectares. It is estimated that 1,810,500 of these hectares are arable. It is among the most arable countries in Europe, with the Chernozem soil across the Bălți Steppe being among the most fertile soils anywhere in the world. With more than 300 days of sunshine per year supporting the cultivation of vineyards, Moldova is also one of the largest wine producers in the world. Moldova's agricultural sector benefits from a geographical proximity to large markets, especially the European Union. As of 2021, agriculture made up 12% of Moldova's overall exports and 21% of overall employment. Its most exported foods are maize, wheat, sunflower seeds, grapes, apples, sugar beets, milk, potatoes, barley, plums/sloes, while relevant and important domestic industries include sugar processing, vegetable oil, food processing, and agricultural machinery. Between 2015 and 2022, agricultural production has almost doubled, particularly in vegetable and fruit production. In July 2023, a network of 20 seed libraries comprising over 1,000 seeds were created across Moldova with the assistance of Ministry of Foreign Affairs of the Czech Republic, NGOs, and the United Nations Development Programme, with the aim is to improve local agricultural biodiversity, climate resilience, and the capacity of local government and farmers to respond effectively to changing environmental conditions.

Nevertheless, the country's agricultural sector faces serious long-term challenges. Despite having relatively modest per capita greenhouse gas emissions, and lower than the world average, Moldova is highly vulnerable to climate change and related environmental disasters which already cost the country 2.13% of annual GDP. According to Climate-KIC, run by the European Institute of Innovation and Technology, "The same region in Moldova can experience intense droughts and devastating floods in the course of a few months, which is the primary concern of local people when they talk about climate. But the irregular nature of these events made it difficult to sustain long term interest from Moldovan people or to channel money from donors."

=== Transport infrastructure ===
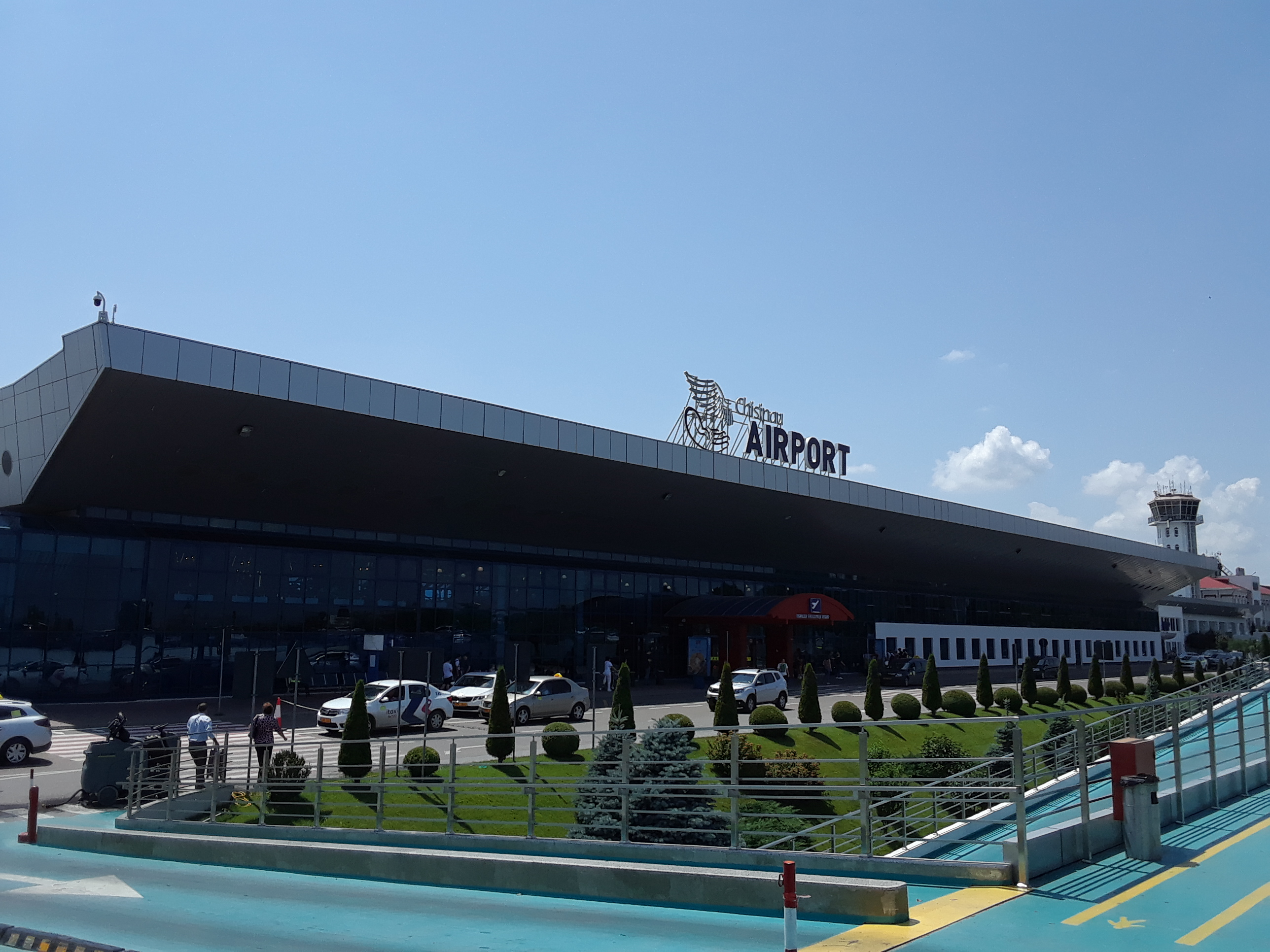
Chișinău Eugen Doga International Airport

The main means of transportation in Moldova are railways 1,138 km (707 mi) and a highway system (12,730 km or 7,910 mi overall, including 10,937 km or 6,796 mi of paved surfaces). Rail links connect it via direct overnight trains to neighbouring Bucharest, Kyiv, Odesa, and also Moscow.

The Giurgiulești terminal on the Danube is compatible with small seagoing vessels. Shipping on the lower Prut and Nistru rivers plays only a modest role in the country's transportation system.

The sole international air gateway of Moldova is the Chișinău Eugen Doga International Airport. with direct flights to and from many European destinations.

=== Telecommunications ===
Internet in Moldova is among the fastest and least expensive in the world as of 2023. The country ranks 3rd in the world by gigabit coverage with around 90% of the population having the option to subscribe to a gigabit-speed fibre-optic broadband plan. The United Nations Development Programme has judged it to have a highly developed digital infrastructure, with 98% 4G coverage of its territory. By July 2022, there were more than 3 million internet users in Moldova, constituting some 76% of the population. Moldova is considering a bid to begin rolling out 5G in 2024, with testing beginning in 2019. Starlink launched in Moldova in August 2022. Information and Communication Technology (ICT) is one of the most promising economic sectors in Moldova, accounting for more than 10 percent of GDP. More than 2,000 Moldovan students per year graduate with a degree in computing or a related field.

The ITU's Global Cybersecurity Index ranks Moldova on the 33rd place in Europe and the 63rd place in the world. The country's joining in 2009 of the Budapest Convention on Cybercrime of the Council of Europe and adoption of the National Cyber Security Programme for 2016–2020 have established the legislative parameters for a safer digital environment. Since Russia's invasion of neighbouring Ukraine and their campaign of cyberwarfare against Moldova, the Moldovan government has invested significant money and resources in developing stronger cybersecurity practices and regulations with assistance from the European Union and United States. The European Union has also set up and funded the Moldova Cybersecurity Rapid Assistance Unit to improve the cyber resilience of Moldova's public sector organisations and key critical infrastructure sectors. Moldova has adopted new legislation partially drafted by the unit which will go into effect on 1 January 2025. The country has also passed legislation in order to more closely align with the EU's GDPR regulations, and is currently mostly compliant.

=== Banking ===
The National Bank of Moldova is responsible for the financial system and has a responsibility to the management and control of all banks in Moldova. It is accountable to the Parliament of Moldova.

== Demographics ==
The most recent national census of Moldova was carried out in 2024 (not including Transnistria).

Population of Moldova according to ethnic group
1. Moldovans (76.7%)
2. Romanians (8.00%)
3. Ukrainians (5.10%)
4. Gagauzians (4.00%)
5. Russians (3.40%)
6. Bulgarians (1.60%)
7. Romani (0.40%)
8. Others (0.80%)
Source: 2024 Moldovan census.

Moldova has an estimated population of approx. 2,423,300 as of 1 January 2024. Moldova is relatively urbanised. According to the 2024 census, 46,4% of the population is urban, with the country having undergone rapid urbanisation in recent years; at the 2014 census, only 38,5% of the population was urban. About one-third of the Moldovan population live in the capital city Chișinău's metropolitan area. As of 2022, the country's population density is 82.8 inhabitants per 1 km^{2}, and average life expectancy was 71.5 years (67.2 for males, and 75.7 for females). There are 100 women per 90 men in Moldova, and employed women have significantly higher levels of education, though women continued to earn 13.6% less than men on average. The number of elderly people (60 years and over) per 100 inhabitants in Moldova has increased year-on-year. The national language is Romanian, a Romance language, though approximately 15% of the Moldovan population also speak Russian as of 2014.

The country has been suffering from long-term population decline due to high levels of emigration (in 2022, 43,000 more people left the country than came) as well as low fertility rates. According to Balkan Insight, the population has fallen by almost 33% since 1990, and by 2035 the total population may be half what it was in 1990. Since 2018, the number of deaths has exceeded the levels of live-births, though the gap has been reduced since 2021. As of 2022, the average number of children per women of childbearing age was 1.69, well below the replacement rate of 2.1, as compared to 1.78 in 2019. The total number of deaths fell by 20.5% in 2022 compared to 2019. Unemployment has remained low at about 3% in 2022.

According to the 2024 national census, ethnic Moldovans made up almost 77% of the country's population, while Romanians (8%), Ukrainians (5%), Gagauzians (4%), and Russians (3%) made up the most substantial ethnic minorities. Smaller populations include Bulgarians, Romani, Belarusians, Jews, Poles and others.

Largest cities in Moldova Source: Moldovan Census (2004); Note: 1. World Gazetteer. Moldova: largest cities 2004. 2. Pridnestrovie.net 2004 Census 2004. 3. National Bureau of Statistics of Moldova
Rank		Pop.	Rank		Pop.
1	Chișinău	644,204	11	Comrat	20,113
2	Tiraspol	129,500	12	Strășeni	18,376
3	Bălți	102,457	13	Durlești	17,210
4	Bender	91,000	14	Ceadîr-Lunga	16,605
5	Rîbnița	46,000	15	Căușeni	15,939
6	Ungheni	30,804	16	Codru	15,934
7	Cahul	30,018	17	Edineț	15,520
8	Soroca	22,196	18	Drochia	13,150
9	Orhei	21,065	19	Ialoveni	12,515
10	Dubăsari	25,700	20	Hîncești	12,491

=== Diaspora and emigration ===
Emigration is a mass phenomenon in Moldova and has a major impact on the country's demographics and economy. It is estimated that more than between 1.2 and 2 million Moldovan citizens (over 25% of the population) are living and working abroad. The Moldovan economy is still heavily reliant on their remittance payments. Moldovans are found across the Balkan region, Western Europe, and North America. Among the most notable Moldovan diaspora populations are: 285,000 in Romania (2020), 258,600 in Ukraine (2002) 156,400 in Russia (2010), 188,923 in Italy (2019), 122,000 in Germany (2022), 26,300 in France (2019), and 20,470 in Canada (2021).

Current trends indicate that the population of Moldova will continue to fall with emigration remaining both chronic and higher than immigration or natural birth rates. In 2020, net emigration fell to a low of 7,000, but by 2022, 43,000 more people left the country than came, though this is slightly down from net emigration of 45,000 in 2021. Russia's invasion of neighbouring Ukraine and the economic impact on Moldova may have been a key contributing factor in the rise from 2020 to 2022. However, there are indications that the invasion of Ukraine and the country's moves towards accession to the European Union may have led to a rise in the number of Moldovan emigrants returning to their country of birth, seeking to help the country join the EU. The Moldovan diaspora also had significant influence on recent Moldovan elections, voting overwhelmingly for Maia Sandu as president in 2020 and for her Party of Action and Solidarity in the 2021 parliamentary election.

=== Language ===
As of March 2023, the only official language of Moldova is Romanian, and all references to the Moldovan language in the constitution and legal bills have been amended to refer to Romanian. The 2014 Moldovan census for the first time collected information about the languages spoken by residents in Moldova. There is a controversy about whether or not Moldovan and Romanian should be considered distinct languages. Counting together, it is the mother tongue of 80.4% of the population. The Moldovan government rejects any distinction, however the census allowed for respondents to respond with their preferred label. The results of the 2024 census were Moldovan (49.2%), Romanian (31.3%), Russian (11.1%), Gagauz (3.8%), Ukrainian (2.9%), Bulgarian (1.2%), Romani (0.3), and others (0.2%).

=== Religion ===
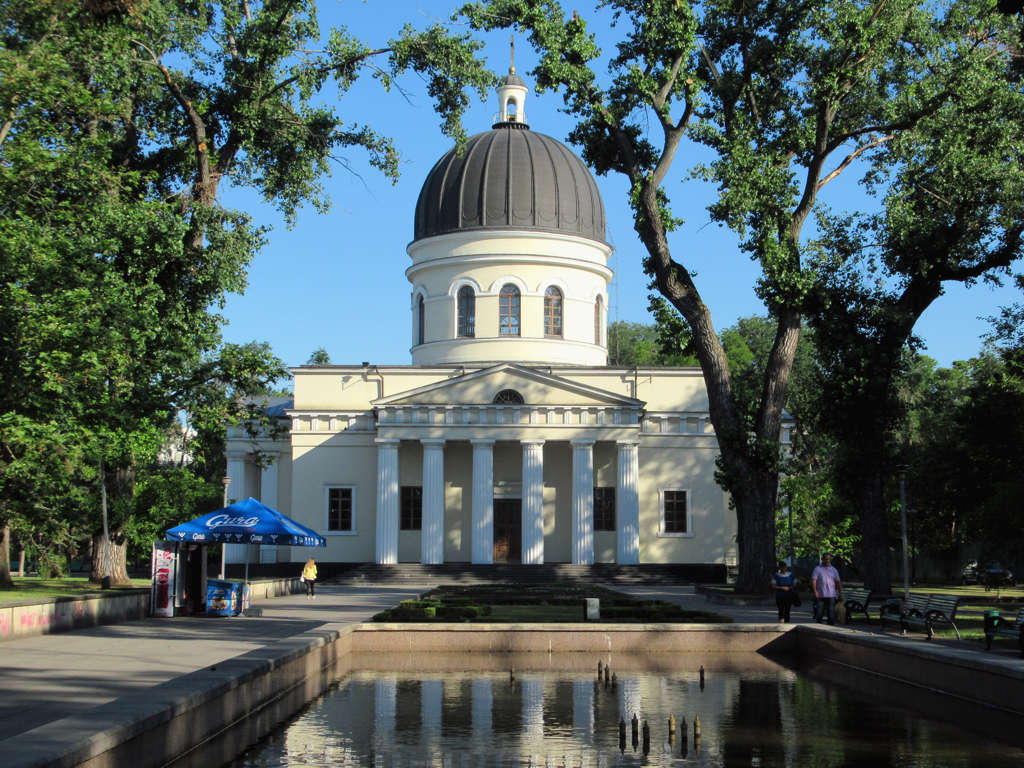
Nativity Cathedral, Chișinău. Moldovan Orthodox Church.

Moldova's constitution provides for freedom of religion and complete separation of church and state, though the constitution cites the "exceptional importance" of Eastern Orthodox Christianity. Discrimination on the basis of religious affiliation is illegal, and incitement to religious and ethnic hatred was made illegal in May 2022. Religion in Moldova is dominated by the Eastern Orthodox branch of Christianity. According to the 2014 Moldovan census, 90% of the country reported to be of the Eastern Orthodox Christian faith. Of this number, approx. 80–90% of Orthodox Moldovans belong to the Moldovan Orthodox Church (formally known as Metropolis of Chișinău and All Moldova) which is subordinate to the Russian Orthodox Church, and has played a powerful role in deepening Russia's influence in Moldova. The remaining 10–20% of Orthodox Moldovans belong to the Metropolis of Bessarabia, which is subordinate to the Romanian Orthodox Church.

As of 2025, the Association of Religion Data Archives estimates that of the Moldovan population (3.7 million outside of Transnistria, which has a population of 533,000), the remaining non-Orthodox religious demography includes: 5.76% (211,000) non-Orthodox Christian (including Catholics and Protestants), 2.45% (90,000) irreligious (including agnostics and atheists); 0.46% (17,000) Muslim, and 0.09% (3,000) religious Jews. In 2011, the Moldovan Ministry of Justice recognised the Islamic League of Moldova as an NGO representing Moldovan Muslims. There are six synagogues in Chișinău, one in Orhei, one in Soroca, and one in Tiraspol, and one mosque in Chișinău. The Jewish Community of the Republic of Moldova is an organisation providing religious services for Moldovan Jews. The Transnistrian authorities estimate that 80% of the Transnistrian population belong to the Moldovan Orthodox Church; the remainder includes other Christians and Jews.

=== Education ===
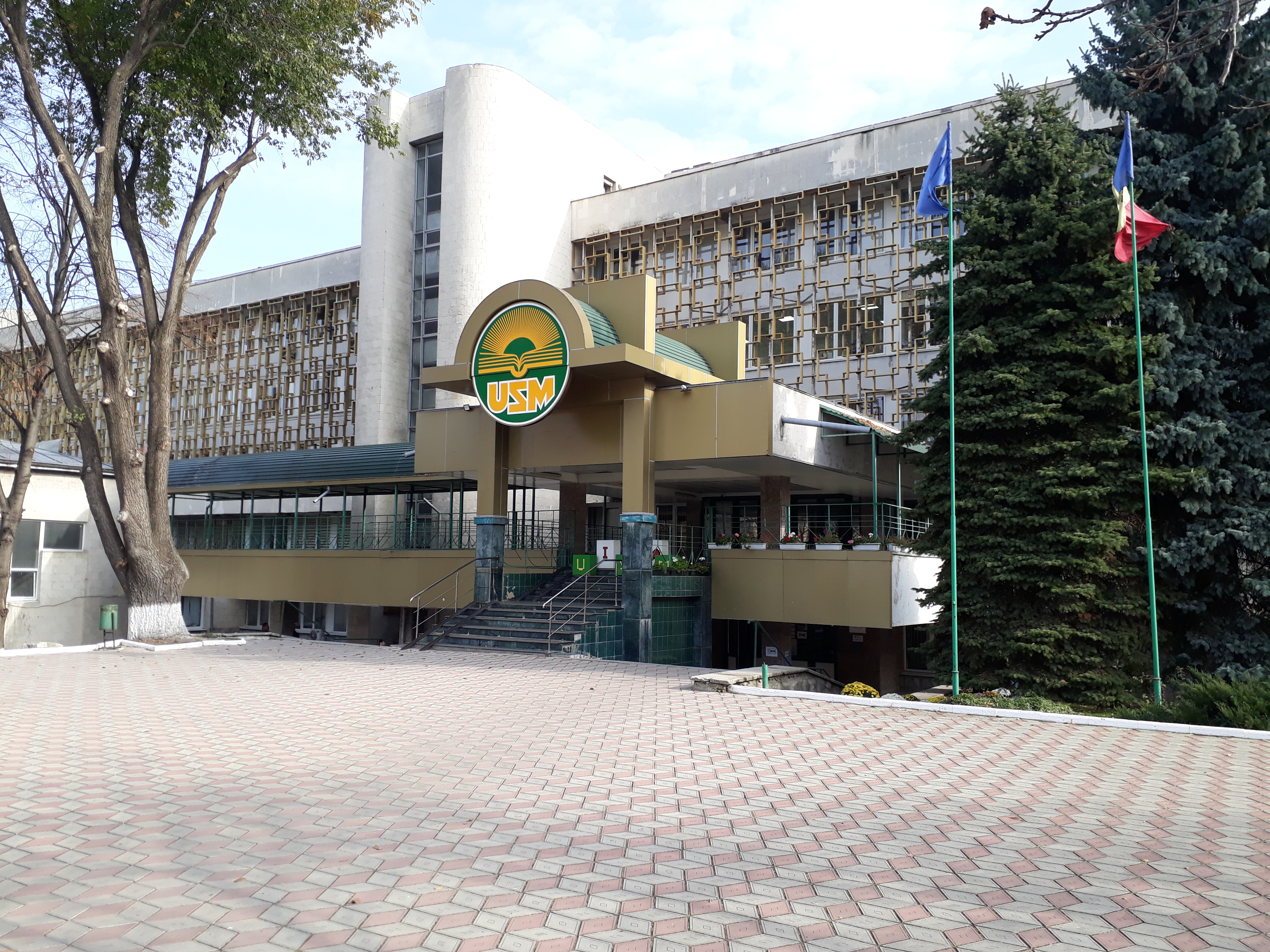
Main building entrance of the Moldova State University

As of the academic year 2022/23, Moldova had 1,218 primary and secondary schools, 90 vocational schools, and 21 higher education institutions, as well as 12 private higher education institutions. There were a total of 437,000 pupils and students. As of 2015, Romania allocates 5,000 scholarships in high schools and universities for Moldovan students. Likewise, more than half of preschool children in Moldova benefit from Romania funded programme to renovate and equip kindergartens. Almost all the population is literate: the literacy rate of the population aged 15 and over is estimated at 99.6%.

The main higher education institutions in Moldova are the Moldova State University (est. 1946) and the Academy of Sciences of Moldova (est. 1961), both of which are located in Chișinău. The Academy of Economic Studies of Moldova (est. 1991) has featured on the Times Higher Education World University Rankings and has educated a number of national leaders including current President of Moldova Maia Sandu and leader of the opposition Igor Dodon. Other important universities include the Ion Creangă State Pedagogical University of Chișinău (est. 1940), Nicolae Testemițanu State University of Medicine and Pharmacy (est. 1945), and the Technical University of Moldova (est. 1964). Women account for 59.1% of students in higher education, and 70.1% of all foreign students in doctoral programmes in Moldova. 32.3% of employed women in Moldova have received higher education, compared to 24.5% of men, and 16.9% specialised secondary education compared to 11.3% of men.

=== Health ===
Structure of deaths by major classes of causes of death in 2022
1. Diseases of the circulatory system (58.0%)
2. Cancerous tumours (15.8%)
3. Other causes (13.9%)
4. Diseases of the digestive tract (7.50%)
5. External causes (4.80%)

Moldova provides universal healthcare through a mandatory health insurance scheme. According to the most recent 2022 official data, per 10,000 inhabitants there are 48.4 doctors and 91 units of average medical staff. Approx. 53% of those aged 16 and over in urban areas described their own health as 'good' or 'very good', compared to approx. 33% of people of the same age in rural areas. The country has 86 hospitals, 1,524 pharmacies and branches, 12,600 physicians, 23,687 paramedical personnel, and 17,293 hospital beds. Moldova spends 6% of its annual GDP on health care, up from 4.9% in 2019.

As of 2022 the average life expectancy was 71.5 years (67.2 for males, and 75.7 for females), slightly lower than comparable countries such as Albania, Bulgaria, Latvia, and Ukraine. The number of elderly people (aged 60 years and over) per 100 inhabitants in Moldova has increased year-on-year. The total fertility rate per woman in 2022 was 1.69, a fall from 1.78 in 2019, and below the replacement rate of 2.1. There were 10.6 live births per 1,000 inhabitants in 2022, a drop from 12.2 in 2019, and 14.2 deaths per 1,000 inhabitants, an increase from 13.7 in 2019 but a significant fall from 17.5 in 2019. Infant mortality per 1,000 live-births was 9.0, a slight increase on 8.7 in 2020.

The overall number of deaths in 2022 fell by 20.5% compared to 2021. According to the National Agency for Public Health, the major causes of death in 2022 were diseases of the circulatory system (58%), cancerous tumours (15.8%), diseases of the digestive tract (7.5%), external causes (4.8%), and other causes (13.9%). More specifically, the leading causes of death in 2019 were Ischaemic heart disease, strokes, hypertensive heart disease, cirrhosis of the liver, and trachea, bronchus, and lung cancers.

On 19 December 2016, the Moldovan parliament approved raising the retirement age to 63 years from the current level of 57 for women and 62 for men, a reform that is part of a 3-year-old assistance programme agreed with the International Monetary Fund. The retirement age will be lifted gradually by a few months every year until it is fully in effect in 2028.

=== Regional differences and tensions ===
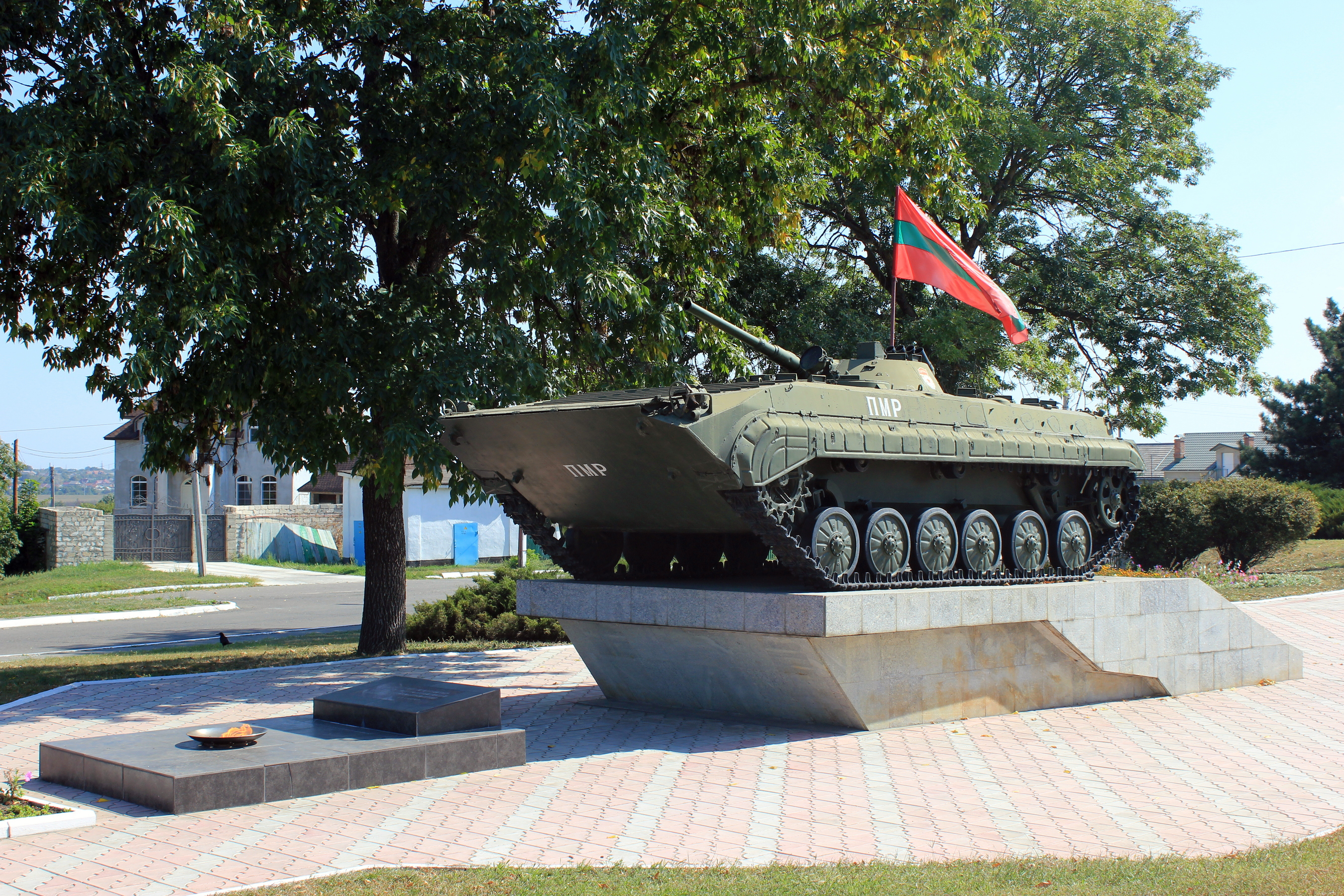
BMP-1 in Bender, Moldova

Moldova has been characterised since independence by a substantial range of profound regional differences across its internationally recognised territory. Since independence, the country has struggled with issues of national identity, geopolitical strategy, and alliances, often torn between Romania and the European Union to the west and the Russian Federation to the east. The unrecognised breakaway state of Transnistria lies in eastern Moldova, on the eastern bank of the Dniester river, and borders Ukraine. It has pursued close diplomatic, military, and economic ties with Russia since 1992, and more than a thousand Russian soldiers are stationed there. This standoff has proved particularly difficult following Russia's invasion of Ukraine in 2022, as Transnistria's position on Ukraine's south-western flank and its hosting of these soldiers pose a potential threat to Ukraine's war efforts. The European Union's High Representative of the Union for Foreign Affairs and Security Policy Josep Borrell has confirmed that the pathway to accession does not depend upon a resolution of the Transnistria conflict. There is further the issue of the autonomous territorial unit of Gagauzia. The Gagauz people are a Turkic-speaking people spread between southern Moldova and the south-west of Ukraine. While their exact origin is considered obscure, they have a strong sense of ethnic identity distinct from that of Moldova, Romania, and Ukraine, with a distinctive language and cultural traditions. They are nevertheless a heavily Russified group. Support for integration with Romania and the European Union is substantially lower among Gagauzians than among the broader Moldovan population. In 2014, shortly before the Republic of Moldova signed its EU Association Agreement, nearly 99 per cent of Gagauzians voted in a referendum "to reject closer links with Europe in favour of joining the Russian-led Eurasian Economic Union." In 2015, "just over half of Gagauzians voted for the Russian-backed socialist candidate Irina Vlakh as governor." Gagauzia continues to represent a serious challenge both to Moldova's territorial sovereignty and political stability due to Russia's systemic involvement in the region, especially by backing pro-Russian local parties and leadership candidates. The European Centre for Minority Issues has also highlighted the role of supposedly neutral NGO groups in Gagauzia as a new front in Russia's hybrid-war against both Moldova and Ukraine. The region's current local leader, Evghenia Guțul, in July 2023 thanked the fugitive Moldovan oligarch Ilan Shor, leader of the outlawed Moldovan pro-Russian opposition Șor Party, for his personal and financial support and his "willingness to do what it takes so that we may fulfil our election promises", and expressed a desire for deeper diplomatic ties with Russia.

There is also substantial controversy over ethnic and linguistic identity in Moldova concerning whether the Moldovan language and Moldovan people constitute separate linguistic and ethnic groups to the Romanian language and Romanian people. The possibility of the unification of Moldova and Romania has remained a popular topic in both countries since Moldova's independence in 1991. Romania and Moldova enjoy exceptionally strong diplomatic relations. Romania supports Moldova's rapid accession to the European Union, provides vast economic assistance to Moldova's struggling economy, and provided up to 90% of Moldova's energy needs via discounted capped prices as Moldova sought to reduce its reliance on Russian oil and natural gas. Relations have strengthened further since Russia's invasion of Ukraine. Up to 74% of the Romanian public and more than 40% of the Moldovan public would support Moldova being integrated into Romania in one form or another, though most in either country believe that 'now is not the right time'. A 2022 survey during the Russian invasion of Ukraine indicated that only 11% of Romania's population supports an immediate union, while over 42% think it is not the moment.

== Culture ==
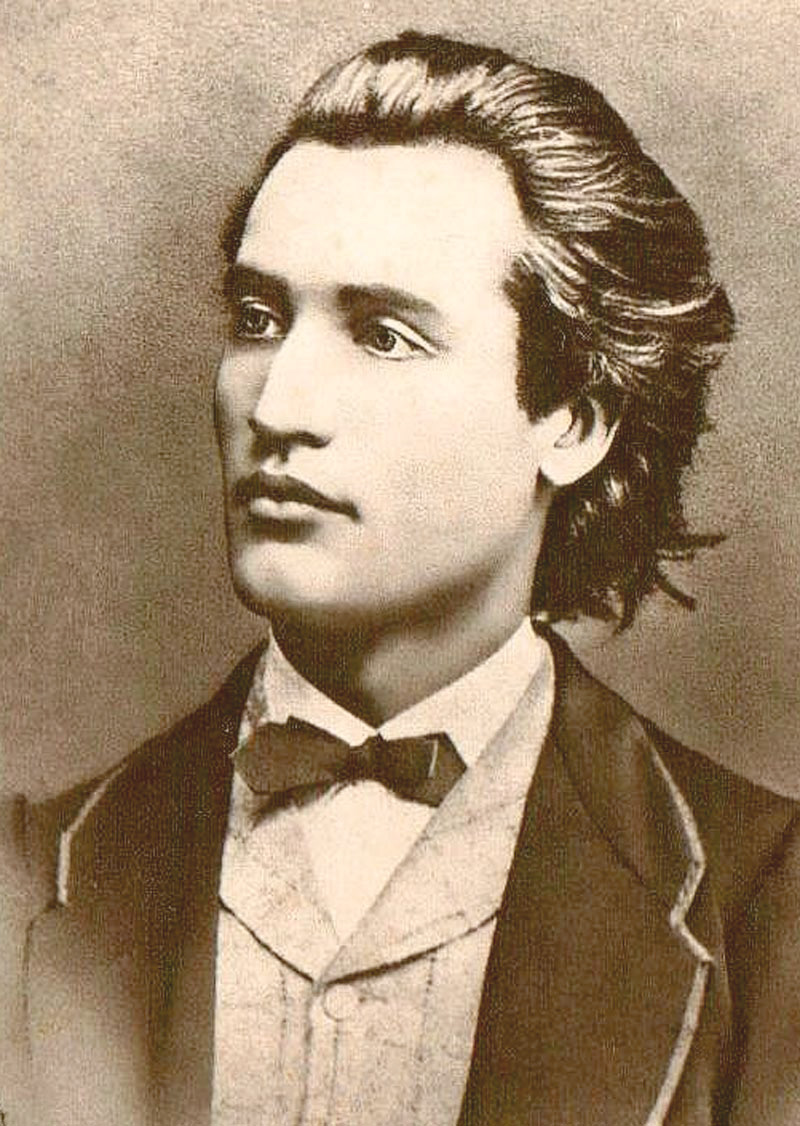
Mihai Eminescu, the national poet of Moldova and Romania

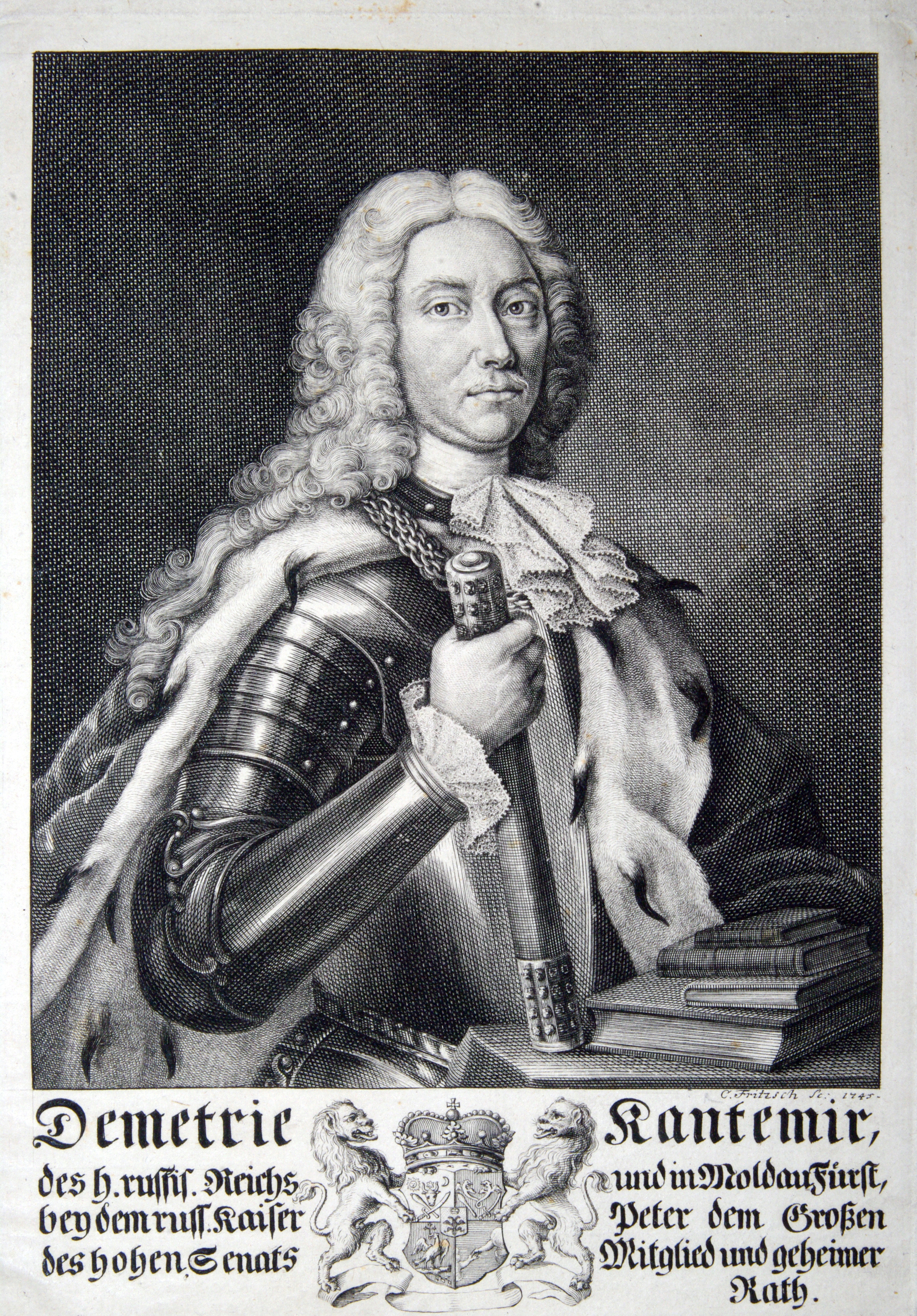
Dimitrie Cantemir, Moldavian scholar of the early Enlightenment

Moldova's cultural tradition has been influenced primarily by the Romanian origins of its majority population, the roots of which go back to the second century AD, the period of Roman colonisation in Dacia. Located geographically at the crossroads of Latin, Slavic and other cultures, Moldova has enriched its own culture adopting and maintaining traditions of neighbouring regions and of other influential sources. The largest ethnic group, which had come to identify itself widely as "Moldovan" by the 14th century, contributed to the shaping of classical Romanian culture. The culture has been also influenced by the Byzantine culture, the neighbouring Magyar and Slavic populations, and later by the Ottoman Turks. A strong Western European influence in Moldovan literature and arts was prevalent in the 19th century. During the periods 1812–1917 and 1944–89, Moldovans were influenced by Russian and Soviet administrative control as well and by ethnic Russian immigration.

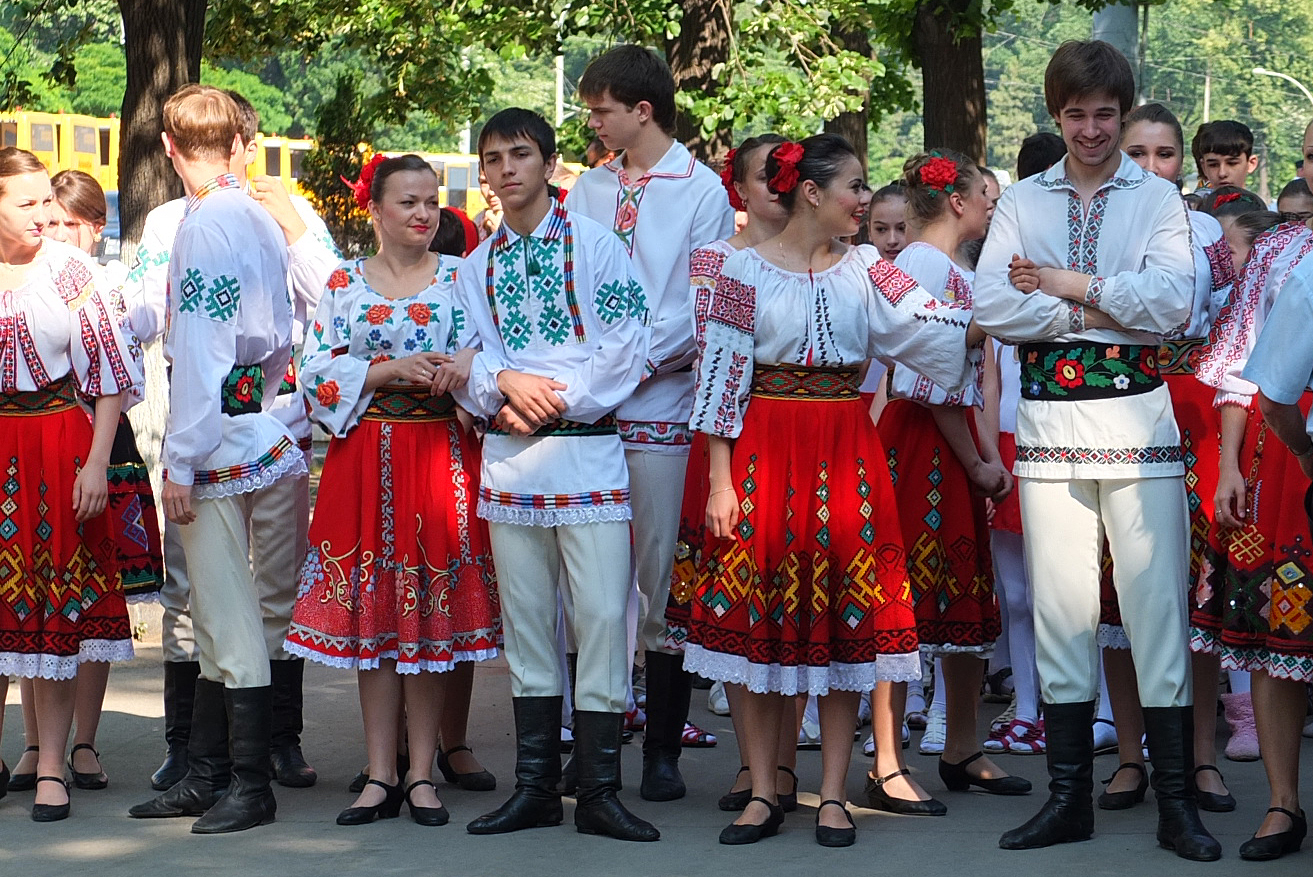
Moldovans wearing national costumes in Chișinău

The country's cultural heritage was marked by numerous churches and monasteries built by the Moldavian ruler Stephen the Great in the 15th century, by the works of the later renaissance Metropolitans Varlaam and Dosoftei, and those of scholars such as Grigore Ureche, Miron Costin, Nicolae Milescu, Dimitrie Cantemir (Note: Prince Dimitrie Cantemir was one of the most important figures of the Moldavian culture of the 18th century. He wrote the first geographical, ethnographic, and economic description of the country. (in Latin) Descriptio Moldaviae, (Berlin, 1714), at Latin Wikisource.) and Ion Neculce. In the 19th century, Moldavians from the territories of the medieval Principality of Moldavia, divided into Bessarabia, Bukovina, and Western Moldavia (after 1859, Romania), made a significant contribution to the formation of the modern Romanian culture. Among these were many Bessarabians, such as Alexandru Donici, Alexandru Hâjdeu, Bogdan Petriceicu Hasdeu, Constantin Stamati, Constantin Stamati-Ciurea, Costache Negruzzi, Alecu Russo, Constantin Stere.

Mihai Eminescu, a late Romantic poet, and Ion Creangă, a writer, are the most influential Romanian language artists, considered national writers both in Romania and Moldova.

=== Holidays ===
Most retail businesses close on New Year's Day and Independence Day, but remain open on all other holidays. Christmas is celebrated either on 7 January, the traditional date in Old Calendarists Eastern Orthodox Churches, or on 25 December, with both dates being recognised as public holidays.

On 1 March features mărțișor gifting, which is a tradition that children and women wear a type of talisman that is given for good luck at the beginning of spring.

=== Music ===
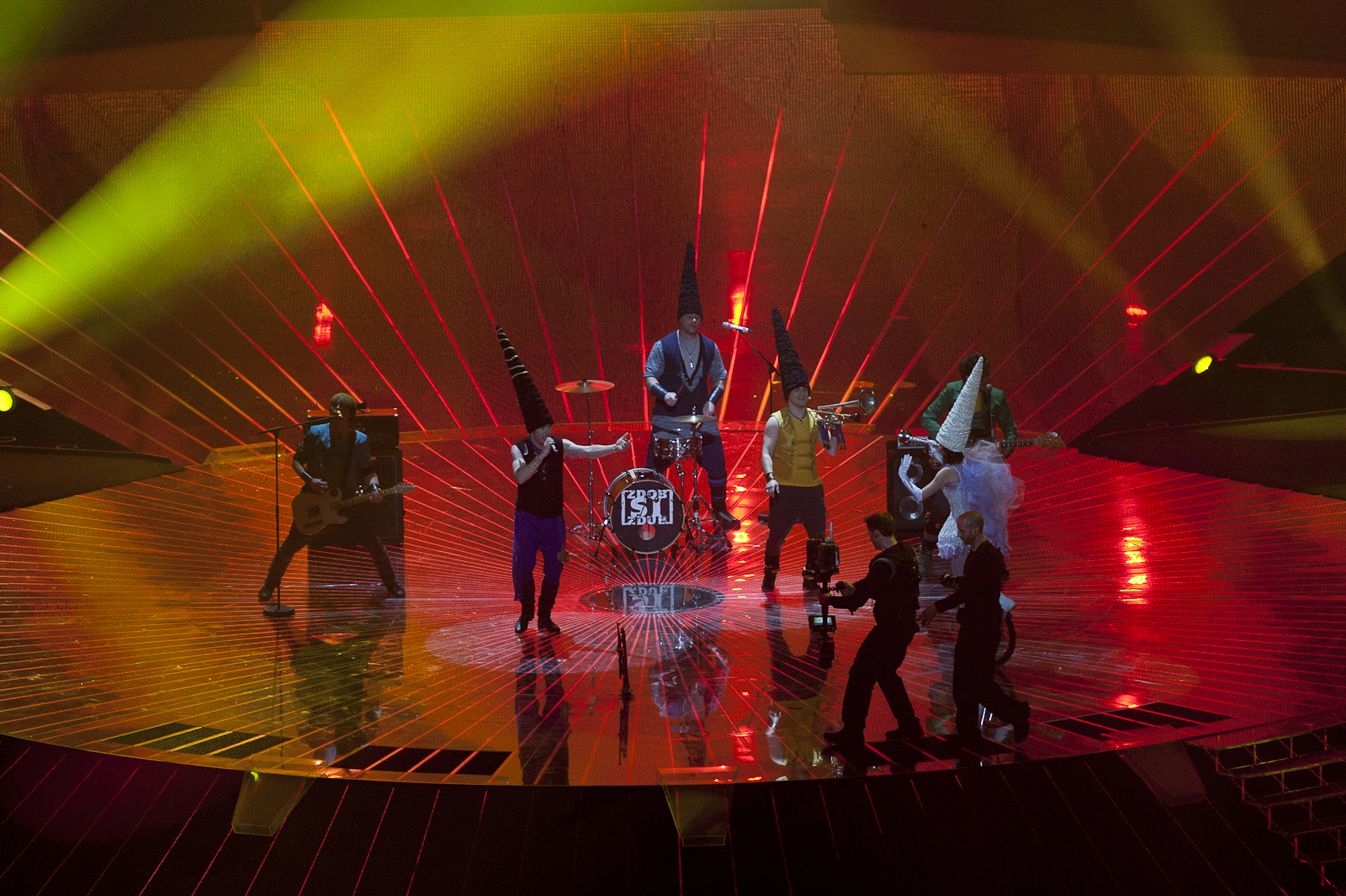
Zdob și Zdub performing at the 2011 Eurovision Song Contest

Among Moldova's most prominent composers are Gavriil Musicescu, Ștefan Neaga and Eugen Doga.

In the field of pop music, Moldova has produced the band O-Zone, who came to prominence in 2003, with their hit song "Dragostea Din Tei", which topped multiple notable single charts. Moldova has been participating in the Eurovision Song Contest since 2005. Another popular band from Moldova is Zdob și Zdub that represented the country in the 2005 Eurovision Song Contest, finishing sixth, also in 2021, with a similar result.

In May 2007, Natalia Barbu represented Moldova in Helsinki at the Eurovision Song Contest 2007 with her entry "Fight". Natalia squeezed into the final by a narrow margin. She took tenth place with 109 points. Then Zdob și Zdub again represented Moldova in the 2011 Eurovision Song Contest finishing 12th.

The band SunStroke Project with Olia Tira represented the country in the 2010 Eurovision Song Contest with their hit song "Run Away". Their performance gained international notoriety as an internet meme due to the pelvic thrusting and dancing of Sergey Stepanov, the band saxophonist. He has been dubbed "Epic Sax Guy". SunStroke Project featured again in the 2017 Eurovision entry "Hey Mama" which got third place.

In 2015 a new musical project by the name of Carla's Dreams has risen in popularity around Moldova. Carla's Dreams reached the top charts in multiple countries in Europe with the release of their song "Sub Pielea Mea" in 2016. The song received a lot of airplay and reached number one place on the charts in Moldova as well as Russia. The group is still active and released their latest album in 2017. The theme of the musical group is "Anonymous" as they perform with painted faces, hoodies and sunglasses. The identity of the group members is still unknown.

Among most prominent classical musicians in Moldova are Maria Bieșu, one of the leading world's sopranos and the winner of the Japan International Competition; pianist Mark Zeltser, winner of the USSR National Competition, Long-Thibaud-Crespin Competition in Paris and Busoni Competition in Bolzano, Italy.

=== Media ===
The right to freedom of speech and right to information are guaranteed by the Moldovan constitution. Reporters Without Borders improved Moldova's Press Freedom Index ranking to 28th in 2023 from 89th in 2020, partly due to government legal reforms which made it easier for journalists to access official information. However, they cautioned that "Moldova's media are diverse but extremely polarised, like the country itself, which is marked by political instability and excessive influence by oligarchs." Moldova's media are divided into pro-Russian and pro-Western camps and on party political lines. Oligarchs and political leaders strongly influence their editorial stances.

Television remains the most popular and trusted medium, while online social media is exerting increasing influence. Most private FM radio networks rebroadcast output from Russian and Romanian stations. The first publicly funded national radio broadcaster, Radio Moldova, has been broadcasting since 1939 from the capital city, Chişinău. Radio Free Europe/Radio Liberty is also widely available. Moldova's state-owned national radio-TV broadcaster is Teleradio-Moldova (TRM), which broadcasts the TV channel Moldova 1.

There were 3 million internet users by July 2022, approximately 76% of the population, and digital infrastructure is well-developed, with 98% 4G coverage of territory. There are a number of daily and weekly newspapers published in Moldova, among the most popular being Timpul de dimineață and Moldova Suverană, but print media has an overall small audience in Moldova. Independent media are struggling to ensure financial sustainability in the face of diminishing advertisement revenues due to inflation, economic stagnation and uncertainty caused by Russia's invasion of Ukraine.

In 2022, the government removed the broadcasting licenses from six television stations for broadcasting pro-Russian propaganda and disinformation about Russia's invasion of Ukraine in violation of the country's Audiovisual Services Code. The government stated that this was done in order to "prevent the risk of disinformation or attempts to manipulate public opinion". All six were either owned or affiliated with Ilan Șhor, a fugitive pro-Russian politician and businessman who fled to Israel in 2019 after being convicted of fraud and money-laundering and sentenced to 15 years in prison in absentia. In October 2023 Orizont TV, ITV, Prime, Publika TV, Canal 2 and Canal 3 were also banned for undermining the local elections as well as blocking a number of Russian media outlets which includes the news agencies TASS and Interfax.

The cinema of Moldova developed in the 1960s during the Soviet period, nurturing a small but lively film industry. Following the collapse of the Soviet Union and Moldova's independence, the country's economic stagnation and poverty has hampered the Moldovan film industry. Nevertheless, some films have seen some international success. Perhaps best-known are Lăutarii (1972), written and directed by Moldovan film-maker Emil Loteanu, and Wedding in Bessarabia (2009), which was co-produced by Romania, Moldova, and Luxembourg. In recent years Moldovan cinema has gained greater international attention. Carbon (2022), directed by Ion Borş, received positive acclaim by magazines such as Variety. It was the winner of the Transilvania International Film Festival's Audience Award. For the 37th edition of the Fribourg International Film Festival, Moldova was featured in its 'New Territory' section, which celebrates little-known film-making cultures. In July 2022, the United Nations Development Programme announced that it would be using advanced equipment to transfer more than 1,600 films from the Moldova-Film archive for posterity and cultural preservation. The United States assisted by equipping in 2021 a digitisation laboratory to restore and preserve its archive feature and documentary films, representing an important part of Moldova's historical, cultural, and artistic heritage, and many of the films were broadcast on national TV with Romanian subtitles.

=== Cuisine ===
Moldova's fertile soil (chernozem) produces plentiful grapes, fruits, vegetables, grains, meat, and milk products, all of which have found their uses in the national cuisine. The fertile black soil combined with the use of traditional agricultural methods permits the growth of a wide range of foods in Moldova. Moldovan cuisine is similar to that of neighbouring Romania and Ukraine, and the regions share many traditional dishes, often with regional variations. Moldovan cuisine has historically been particularly influenced by elements of Russian, Turkish, and Ukrainian cuisine. Main dishes often include beef, pork, potatoes, cabbage, and a variety of cereals. Popular alcoholic beverages are divin (Moldovan brandy), beer, and wine—for which the country is known due to its high-quality offerings.

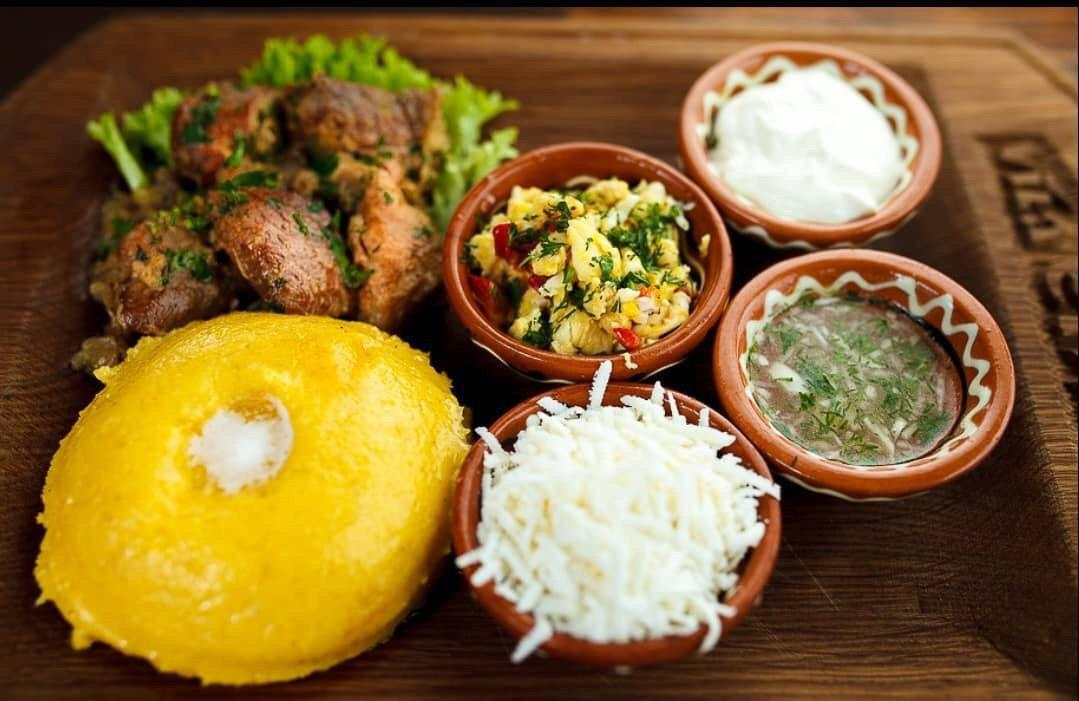
Mămăligă

There are several traditional Moldovan dishes. Plăcinte are stuffed and deep-fried pastries with fillings such as soft cheese (often Urdă), cabbage, potatoes, apples, sour cherries and others, both sweet and savoury. Sarmale is a typical Moldovan dish usually consisting of cabbage leaves stuffed with rice, peppers, carrots, meat, and baked in oil. Regional variations can also be found in other former parts of the Ottoman Empire. Mămăligă, a kind of porridge made from yellow maize flour, is another staple. It is popular in other countries as polenta and is often served with sheep's cheese and sour cream. Another traditional dish, plachyndy, is a kind of flatbread often made with kefir or buttermilk, wrapped around herbs, and pan-fried in oil. Zeamă is a thin chicken soup, typically consisting of homemade chicken broth prepared with a smaller whole chicken, water, thin homemade egg noodles (tăiței de casă), and a variety of finely chopped vegetables and herbs. Brynza is a soft sheep/goat cheese with a crumbly texture and tangy taste, mostly produced and popular in Slovakia, Romania, and Moldova, and often used in salads, pies, and dumplings.

Borscht, a sour Eastern European soup made from beetroots, meat stock, and vegetables, is also popular and commonly served in Moldova. As with other parts of the region, pierogi (known as chiroște in Moldova) are another traditional staple and are often stuffed with a soft cheese in Moldova. The dough is made with wheat flour and is boiled in salted water, pan-fried in oil, or baked in the oven. Medovik, a cake of Russian origin (and called Tort Smetanik in Moldova) is a popular layered cake with honey and smetana (sour cream) or condensed milk.

Total recorded adult alcohol consumption is approximately evenly split between spirits, beer, and wine. Moldova has among the highest alcohol consumption per capita in world, at 15.2 litres (4.0 US gal) of pure alcohol imbibed in 2016. This has fallen somewhat in recent years, but it remains a serious ongoing health concern.

=== Sports ===
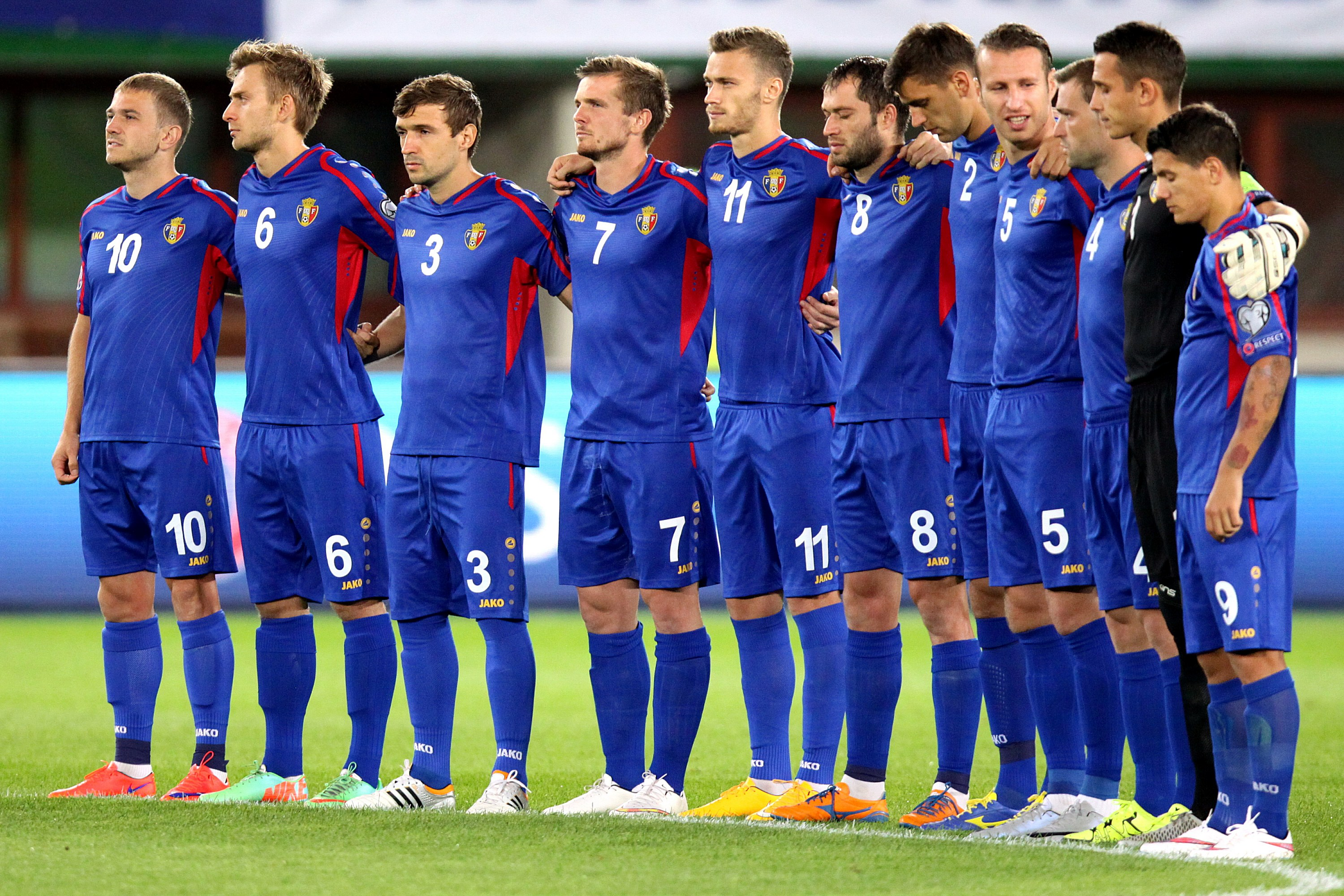
Moldova national football team in 2015

Association football is the most popular team sport in Moldova. The governing body is the Moldovan Football Federation, which belongs to UEFA. The Moldova national football team played its first match in 1994, but never qualified to the UEFA European Championship. The most successful football club is Sheriff Tiraspol, the first and only Moldovan club to qualify for the group stage of the Champions League and the Europa League. Other winners of the Moldovan National Division include Zimbru Chișinău, Dacia Chișinău, FC Tiraspol and Milsami Orhei.

Trîntă (a form of wrestling) is the national sport in Moldova. Rugby union is popular as well. More than 10,000 supporters turn out for home internationals. Since 2004, playing numbers at all levels have more than doubled to 3,200. Despite the hardships and deprivations the national team are ranked 34th in the world. The most prestigious cycling race is the Moldova President's Cup, which was first run in 2004. In chess, the Republic of Moldova has several international masters, among which can be mentioned Viorel Iordăchescu, Dmitry Svetushkin, and Viorel Bologan.

Radu Albot is one of the most successful Moldovan tennis players, with ATP singles (2019 Delray Beach Open) and doubles (2015 Istanbul Open) titles.

Athletes from Moldova have won European medals in athletics, biathlon, football, and gymnastics; world medals in archery, judo, swimming, and taekwondo; as well as Olympic medals in boxing, canoeing, shooting, weightlifting, and wrestling. Moldova made its Olympic debut at the 1994 Winter Olympics in Lillehammer. Olympic medalists include Sergei Mureiko, Oleg Moldovan, Vitalie Grușac, Veaceslav Gojan, and Serghei Tarnovschi. Nicolae Juravschi represented the Soviet Union at the 1988 Seoul Games, winning two medals.

== See also ==
- Outline of Moldova
