= Geography of Moldova =

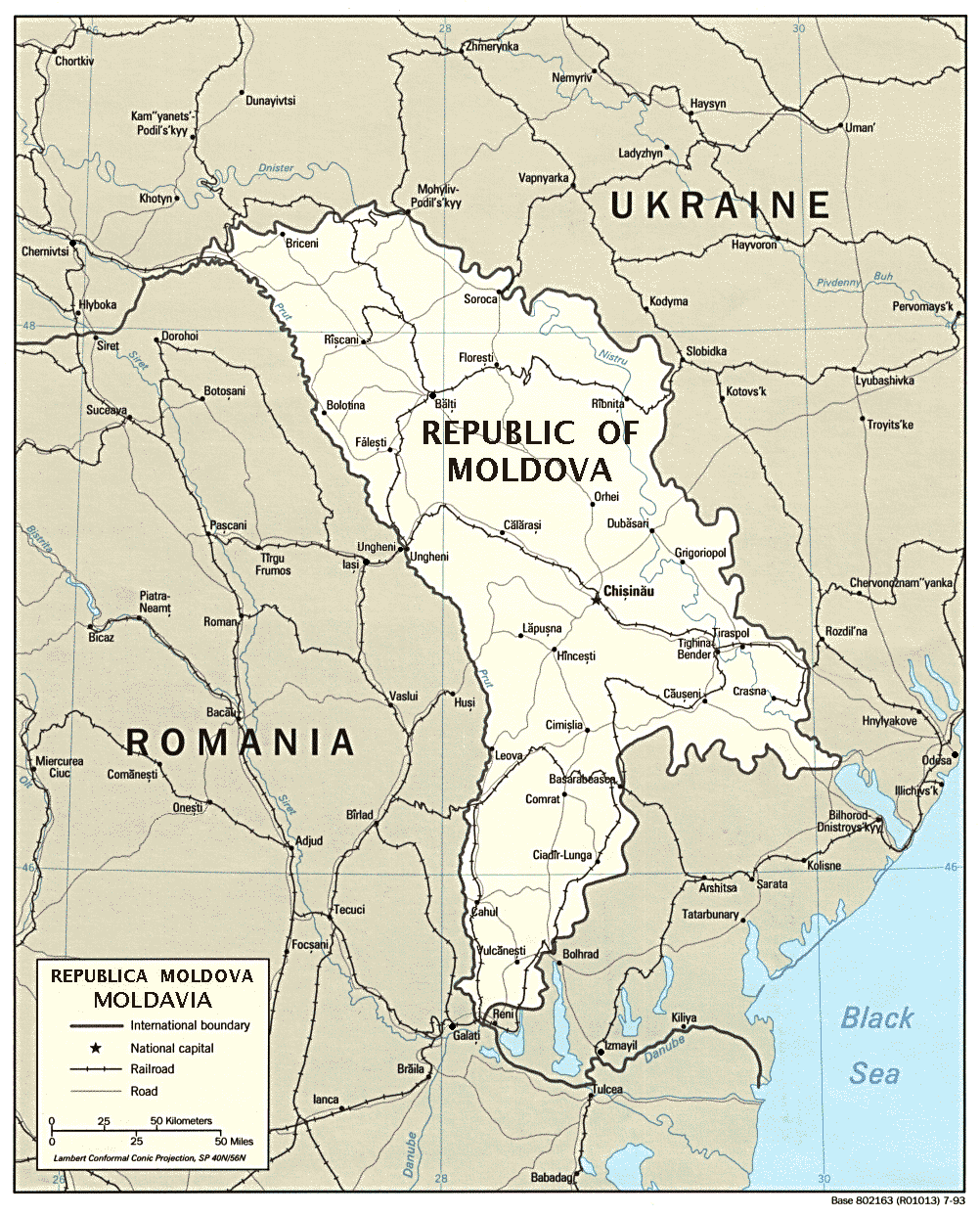
- Continent: Europe
- Region: Eastern Europe
- Coordinates: 47°N 29°E
- Area: Ranked 135th
  - Total: 33,843.5 km^{2} (13,067.0 sq mi)
  - Land: 98.6%
  - Water: 1.4%
- Coastline: 0.407 km (0.253 mi)
- Borders: Total land borders: Moldova–Ukraine border, Moldova–Romania border
- Highest point: Bălănești Hill; 428.9 m
- Lowest point: 2 m (Dniester River)

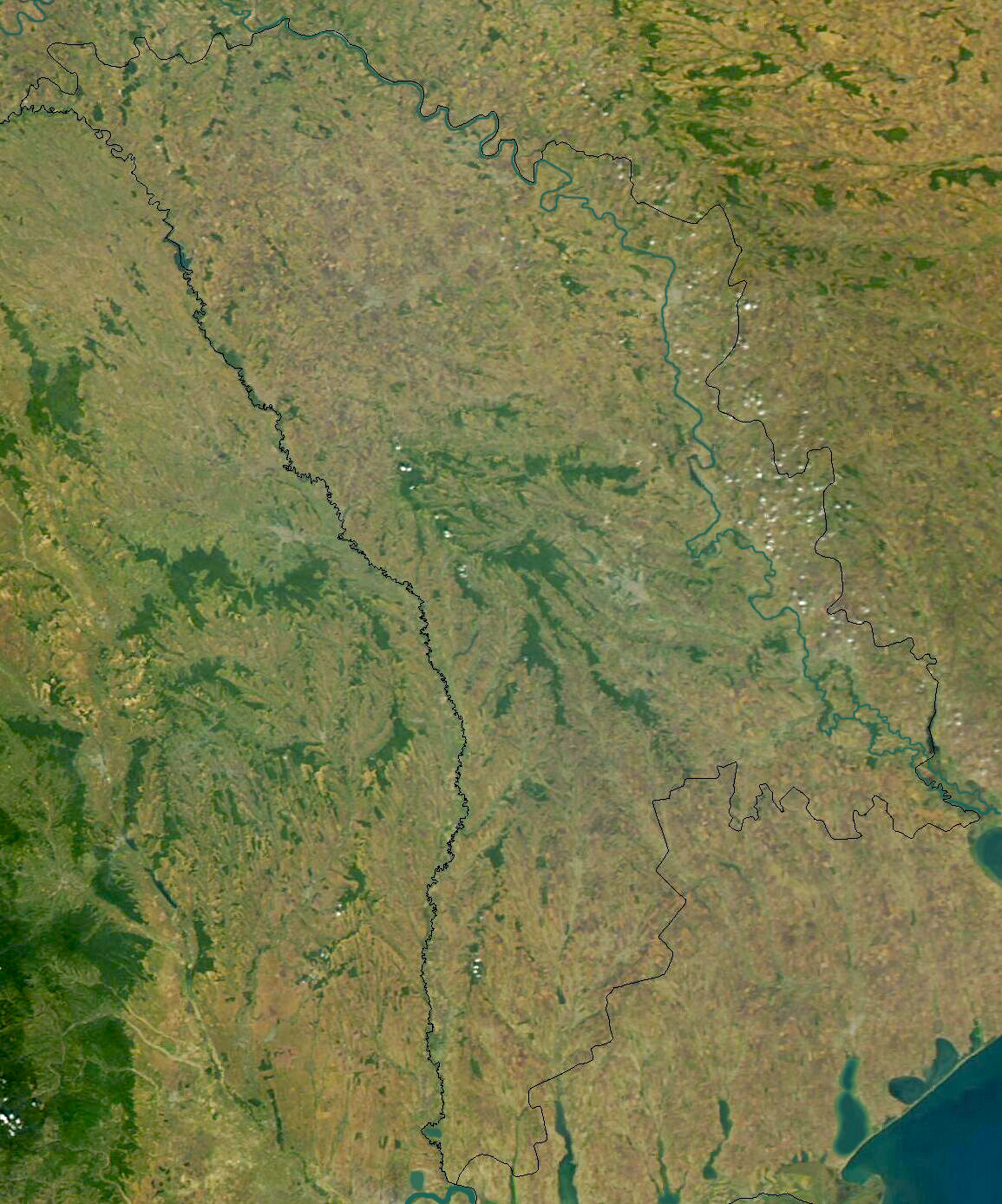
Satellite image of Moldova in September 2003

Köppen–Geiger climate classification map for Moldova

Located in Eastern Europe, Moldova is bordered on the west and southwest by Romania and on the north, south, and east by Ukraine. Most of its territory lies in the Bessarabia region, between the area's two main rivers, the Nistru and the Prut. The Nistru forms a small part of Moldova's border with Ukraine in the northeast and southeast, but it mainly flows through the eastern part of the country, separating Bessarabia and Transnistria. The Prut River forms Moldova's entire western boundary with Romania. The Danube touches the Moldovan border at its southernmost tip, and forms the border for 200 metres (656 ft).

== Basic data ==
Location:	Eastern Europe, northeast of Romania
Geographic coordinates:	47°00′N 29°00′E
Map references:	Commonwealth of Independent States
Area:	total: 33,851 km^{2} (13,070 sq mi).); land: 32,891 km^{2} (12,699 sq mi).); water: 960 km^{2} (370 sq mi).)
Area – comparative:	slightly larger than Maryland, United States; slightly larger than Vancouver Island, Canada; slightly less than 1/2 the size of Tasmania, Australia; slightly smaller than Taiwan; slightly larger than Belgium, EU
Land boundaries:	total: 1,390 km (860 mi); border countries: Romania 450 km (280 mi), Ukraine 940 km (580 mi)
Coastline:	0 km (0 mi) (landlocked)
Maritime claims:	none (landlocked)
Natural resources:	lignite, phosphorites, gypsum, arable land, limestone
Land use:	arable land: 53.47%; permanent crops: 8.77%; other: 37.75% (2011)
Irrigated land:	2,283 km^{2} (881 sq mi) (2011)
Total renewable water resources:	11.65 km ^{3} (2.8 cu. mi.)
Natural hazards:	landslides (57 cases in 1998)

== Climate ==
Moldova's proximity to the Black Sea gives it a mild and sunny climate.

Moldova's climate is moderately continental: the summers are warm and long, with temperatures averaging about 20 °C (68 °F), and the winters are relatively mild and dry, with January temperatures averaging −2 °C (28 °F). Annual rainfall, which ranges from around 600 millimeters (24 in) in the north to 400 millimeters (16 in) in the south, can vary greatly; long dry spells are not unusual. The heaviest rainfall occurs in early summer and again in October; heavy showers and thunderstorms are common. Because of the irregular terrain, heavy summer rains often cause erosion and river silting.

The highest temperature ever recorded was 42.4 °C (108.3 °F) at Fălești on 7 August 2012. The lowest temperature ever recorded was −35.5 °C (−31.9 °F) on January 20, 1963, at Brătușeni.

Climate data for Moldova
Month	Jan	Feb	Mar	Apr	May	Jun	Jul	Aug	Sep	Oct	Nov	Dec	Year
Record high °C (°F)	18.4 (65.1)	23.3 (73.9)	27.9 (82.2)	32.5 (90.5)	37.0 (98.6)	40.1 (104.2)	41.5 (106.7)	42.4 (108.3)	38.6 (101.5)	33.6 (92.5)	30.0 (86.0)	18.9 (66.0)	42.4 (108.3)
Record low °C (°F)	−35.5 (−31.9)	−32.1 (−25.8)	−25.8 (−14.4)	−14.2 (6.4)	−3.8 (25.2)	1.6 (34.9)	5.5 (41.9)	2.0 (35.6)	−6.3 (20.7)	−10.8 (12.6)	−21.7 (−7.1)	−30.2 (−22.4)	−35.5 (−31.9)
Source: Serviciul Hidrometeorologic de Stat

Climate data for Chișinău (1991–2020, extremes 1886–present)
Month	Jan	Feb	Mar	Apr	May	Jun	Jul	Aug	Sep	Oct	Nov	Dec	Year
Record high °C (°F)	15.5 (59.9)	20.7 (69.3)	25.7 (78.3)	31.6 (88.9)	35.9 (96.6)	37.5 (99.5)	40.1 (104.2)	39.2 (102.6)	37.3 (99.1)	32.6 (90.7)	23.6 (74.5)	18.3 (64.9)	40.1 (104.2)
Mean daily maximum °C (°F)	1.1 (34.0)	3.4 (38.1)	9.2 (48.6)	16.4 (61.5)	22.3 (72.1)	26.1 (79.0)	28.4 (83.1)	28.3 (82.9)	22.3 (72.1)	15.5 (59.9)	8.1 (46.6)	2.7 (36.9)	15.3 (59.5)
Daily mean °C (°F)	−1.8 (28.8)	−0.2 (31.6)	4.5 (40.1)	11.0 (51.8)	16.8 (62.2)	20.7 (69.3)	22.9 (73.2)	22.6 (72.7)	17.0 (62.6)	10.8 (51.4)	4.8 (40.6)	−0.2 (31.6)	10.7 (51.3)
Mean daily minimum °C (°F)	−4.2 (24.4)	−3.0 (26.6)	0.7 (33.3)	6.3 (43.3)	11.8 (53.2)	15.9 (60.6)	17.9 (64.2)	17.5 (63.5)	12.5 (54.5)	7.1 (44.8)	2.1 (35.8)	−2.5 (27.5)	6.8 (44.2)
Record low °C (°F)	−28.4 (−19.1)	−28.9 (−20.0)	−21.1 (−6.0)	−6.6 (20.1)	−1.1 (30.0)	3.6 (38.5)	7.8 (46.0)	5.5 (41.9)	−2.4 (27.7)	−10.8 (12.6)	−21.6 (−6.9)	−22.4 (−8.3)	−28.9 (−20.0)
Average precipitation mm (inches)	36 (1.4)	31 (1.2)	35 (1.4)	39 (1.5)	54 (2.1)	65 (2.6)	67 (2.6)	49 (1.9)	48 (1.9)	47 (1.9)	43 (1.7)	41 (1.6)	555 (21.9)
Average extreme snow depth cm (inches)	7 (2.8)	6 (2.4)	3 (1.2)	0 (0)	0 (0)	0 (0)	0 (0)	0 (0)	0 (0)	0 (0)	1 (0.4)	3 (1.2)	20 (7.9)
Average rainy days	8	7	11	13	14	14	12	10	10	11	12	10	132
Average snowy days	13	13	8	1	0.03	0	0	0	0	0.4	5	11	51
Average relative humidity (%)	82	78	71	63	60	63	62	60	66	73	81	83	70
Mean monthly sunshine hours	75	80	125	187	254	283	299	295	226	169	75	58	2,126
Average ultraviolet index	1	2	3	4	6	7	7	7	5	3	1	1	4
Source 1: Pogoda.ru.net, NOAA (sun, 1961–1990)
Source 2: Weather Atlas (UV)

Climate data for Bălți (1991–2020, extremes 1945–present)
Month	Jan	Feb	Mar	Apr	May	Jun	Jul	Aug	Sep	Oct	Nov	Dec	Year
Record high °C (°F)	15.9 (60.6)	21.6 (70.9)	25.8 (78.4)	31.3 (88.3)	35.5 (95.9)	37.9 (100.2)	39.8 (103.6)	40.0 (104.0)	37.3 (99.1)	31.6 (88.9)	24.8 (76.6)	18.8 (65.8)	40.0 (104.0)
Mean daily maximum °C (°F)	0.9 (33.6)	3.3 (37.9)	9.5 (49.1)	17.1 (62.8)	23.3 (73.9)	26.7 (80.1)	28.7 (83.7)	28.5 (83.3)	22.6 (72.7)	15.7 (60.3)	8.3 (46.9)	2.4 (36.3)	15.6 (60.1)
Daily mean °C (°F)	−2.3 (27.9)	−0.7 (30.7)	4.1 (39.4)	10.7 (51.3)	16.4 (61.5)	20.2 (68.4)	22.0 (71.6)	21.4 (70.5)	16.0 (60.8)	9.9 (49.8)	4.3 (39.7)	−0.8 (30.6)	10.1 (50.2)
Mean daily minimum °C (°F)	−5.5 (22.1)	−4.2 (24.4)	−0.5 (31.1)	4.8 (40.6)	10.1 (50.2)	14.1 (57.4)	15.8 (60.4)	15.0 (59.0)	10.4 (50.7)	5.1 (41.2)	1.0 (33.8)	−3.9 (25.0)	5.2 (41.4)
Record low °C (°F)	−35.4 (−31.7)	−32.1 (−25.8)	−24.4 (−11.9)	−13.9 (7.0)	−2.3 (27.9)	3.4 (38.1)	7.3 (45.1)	3.1 (37.6)	−5.6 (21.9)	−10.1 (13.8)	−18.4 (−1.1)	−30.2 (−22.4)	−35.4 (−31.7)
Average precipitation mm (inches)	25 (1.0)	24 (0.9)	28 (1.1)	35 (1.4)	49 (1.9)	68 (2.7)	68 (2.7)	48 (1.9)	48 (1.9)	36 (1.4)	32 (1.3)	28 (1.1)	489 (19.3)
Average precipitation days (≥ 1.0 mm)	6	5	6	6	8	8	8	6	6	5	5	6	74
Average relative humidity (%)	83	82	77	66	64	67	67	68	71	76	83	86	74
Mean monthly sunshine hours	59	87	151	204	254	266	282	278	209	144	73	56	2,058
Source 1: NOAA
Source 2: Serviciul Hidrometeorologic de Stat (extremes, relative humidity)

Climate data for Tiraspol (1991–2020, extremes 1935–present)
Month	Jan	Feb	Mar	Apr	May	Jun	Jul	Aug	Sep	Oct	Nov	Dec	Year
Record high °C (°F)	17.4 (63.3)	23.3 (73.9)	27.3 (81.1)	32.3 (90.1)	36.9 (98.4)	39.1 (102.4)	41.0 (105.8)	40.5 (104.9)	38.5 (101.3)	33.3 (91.9)	25.3 (77.5)	18.3 (64.9)	41.0 (105.8)
Mean daily maximum °C (°F)	1.8 (35.2)	4.7 (40.5)	10.6 (51.1)	17.7 (63.9)	23.6 (74.5)	27.6 (81.7)	30.3 (86.5)	29.9 (85.8)	23.8 (74.8)	16.5 (61.7)	9.2 (48.6)	3.3 (37.9)	16.6 (61.9)
Daily mean °C (°F)	−1.8 (28.8)	−0.2 (31.6)	4.5 (40.1)	10.9 (51.6)	16.7 (62.1)	20.9 (69.6)	23.2 (73.8)	22.7 (72.9)	17.0 (62.6)	10.7 (51.3)	4.9 (40.8)	−0.1 (31.8)	10.8 (51.4)
Mean daily minimum °C (°F)	−5.2 (22.6)	−4.1 (24.6)	−0.5 (31.1)	4.6 (40.3)	9.9 (49.8)	14.4 (57.9)	16.3 (61.3)	15.7 (60.3)	10.8 (51.4)	5.6 (42.1)	1.3 (34.3)	−3.3 (26.1)	5.5 (41.9)
Record low °C (°F)	−29.4 (−20.9)	−29.6 (−21.3)	−19.9 (−3.8)	−8.5 (16.7)	−2.7 (27.1)	3.3 (37.9)	8.0 (46.4)	5.0 (41.0)	−4.6 (23.7)	−9.2 (15.4)	−16.3 (2.7)	−25.1 (−13.2)	−29.6 (−21.3)
Average precipitation mm (inches)	35 (1.4)	27 (1.1)	30 (1.2)	31 (1.2)	47 (1.9)	66 (2.6)	57 (2.2)	48 (1.9)	49 (1.9)	39 (1.5)	38 (1.5)	33 (1.3)	500 (19.7)
Average precipitation days (≥ 1.0 mm)	6	5	6	5	7	7	6	4	5	5	5	6	69
Average relative humidity (%)	83	81	76	66	64	66	65	65	71	76	83	85	73
Mean monthly sunshine hours	60	88	146	206	281	301	324	306	215	153	73	52	2,224
Source 1: NOAA
Source 2: Serviciul Hidrometeorologic de Stat (extremes, relative humidity)

Climate data for Cahul, Moldova (1991–2020, extremes 1947–present)
Month	Jan	Feb	Mar	Apr	May	Jun	Jul	Aug	Sep	Oct	Nov	Dec	Year
Record high °C (°F)	17.1 (62.8)	20.9 (69.6)	26.0 (78.8)	30.6 (87.1)	37.0 (98.6)	38.3 (100.9)	40.3 (104.5)	39.3 (102.7)	35.3 (95.5)	30.8 (87.4)	24.5 (76.1)	17.4 (63.3)	39.4 (102.9)
Mean daily maximum °C (°F)	1.4 (34.5)	4.2 (39.6)	10.0 (50.0)	16.7 (62.1)	22.5 (72.5)	26.4 (79.5)	28.9 (84.0)	28.9 (84.0)	23.2 (73.8)	16.2 (61.2)	9.1 (48.4)	3.0 (37.4)	15.9 (60.6)
Daily mean °C (°F)	−1.6 (29.1)	0.3 (32.5)	5.0 (41.0)	11.0 (51.8)	16.7 (62.1)	20.7 (69.3)	23.0 (73.4)	22.8 (73.0)	17.4 (63.3)	11.3 (52.3)	5.4 (41.7)	0.0 (32.0)	11.0 (51.8)
Mean daily minimum °C (°F)	−4.2 (24.4)	−2.8 (27.0)	1.1 (34.0)	6.2 (43.2)	11.6 (52.9)	15.6 (60.1)	17.7 (63.9)	17.3 (63.1)	12.5 (54.5)	7.4 (45.3)	2.6 (36.7)	−2.5 (27.5)	6.9 (44.4)
Record low °C (°F)	−24.9 (−12.8)	−25.8 (−14.4)	−17.5 (0.5)	−4.6 (23.7)	1.3 (34.3)	5.3 (41.5)	9.0 (48.2)	5.4 (41.7)	−3.0 (26.6)	−7.1 (19.2)	−15.8 (3.6)	−21.7 (−7.1)	−25.8 (−14.4)
Average precipitation mm (inches)	28 (1.1)	25 (1.0)	31 (1.2)	39 (1.5)	51 (2.0)	68 (2.7)	59 (2.3)	46 (1.8)	51 (2.0)	46 (1.8)	35 (1.4)	36 (1.4)	516 (20.3)
Average precipitation days (≥ 1.0 mm)	6	5	6	6	8	7	6	5	4	5	5	6	69
Average relative humidity (%)	84	82	75	67	65	66	64	64	67	74	83	86	73
Mean monthly sunshine hours	82	111	160	208	273	299	325	304	228	168	91	78	2,323
Source 1: NOAA
Source 2: Serviciul Hidrometeorologic de Stat (extremes, relative humidity)

== Topography ==
Moldavian Plateau
Topography
Bukovinian Subcarpathians; Moldavian Subcarpathians Suceava Plateau; Dniester Hills; Moldavian Plain; Bârlad Plateau; Central Moldavian Plateau Bălți Steppe; Bugeac Steppe
Hydrography
Danube; Siret (Moldova, Suceava); Prut; Dniester (Răut); Black Sea
Climate
Romania; Moldova
Flora & Fauna
Flora of Romania; Flora of Moldova; List of mammals in Romania; List of mammals in Moldova; Protected areas in Romania; Protected areas in Moldova

Most of Moldova's territory is a moderate hilly plateau cut deeply by many streams and rivers. Geologically, Moldova lies primarily on the deep sedimentary rock that gives way to harder crystalline outcroppings only in the north. Moldova's hills are part of the larger Moldavian Plateau.

The northern landscape of Moldova is characterized by gently rolling uplands (up to 300 m or 984 ft, in elevation) interlaced with small flat plains in the valleys of the numerous creeks (at 150 m or 492 ft elevation). These hills, which have an average altitude of 240 meters (787 ft) and a maximum altitude of 320 meters (1,050 ft), are divided into the Northern Moldovan Plateau and the Dniester Plateau, and continue further occupying the northern part of the Chernivtsi oblast in Ukraine. The eastern slopes of the Dniester Ridge (average 250 meters or 820 feet, max 347 meters or 1,138 feet), form the high right bank of the Dniester River.

To the south are located the Bălți Plain and the Middle Prut Plain, with an average of 200 meters (656 ft) and a maximum altitude of 250 meters (820 ft). Originally forested, it has been extensively de-forested for agriculture during the 19th and 20th centuries. In contrast to the region to the north and south, which is more slant, this area is referred to as plain, although it has relief very different from that of flatland, and vegetation different from that of the steppe.

The hills of central Moldova are divided into the Ciulucuri Hills and the Codri Plateau, at an average elevation of about 350 to 400 m (1,148 to 1,312 ft), are ridges interlaced by deep, flat valleys, ravines, and landslide-scoured depressions. Steep forest-clad slopes account for much of the terrain, where the most common trees are hornbeam, oak, linden, maple, wild pear, and wild cherry. The term codri refers more generally to forests, yet since in Moldova most of them were preserved in the central part, Codri sometimes can colloquially refer to the remaining forests in the hills west and north of Chișinău. The Dniester Hills border the Ciulucuri Hills to the north along the river Răut.

The country's highest point, Bălănești Hill, which reaches 1,407 or 1,410 ft (428.9 or 429.8 m), depending on the source, is situated in the Corneşti Hills, the western part of the Codri Plateau. Northwest of it are the Ciulucului Hills (average 250 meters or 820 feet, max 388 meters or 1,273 feet). In the south, the Tigheci Hills (average 200 meters or 656 feet, max 301 meters or 988 feet) are a prolongation, and run to the south parallel to the Lower Prut Valley.

To the south-east, the southern part of the Codri Plateau, which averages 150–200 meters (492–656 ft), max 250 meters (820 ft), and has numerous ravines and gullies, gradually merges into the Southern Moldovan Plain, continued by in Ukraine by the Budjak Plain. Most of Gagauzia resides on the Ialpug Plain.

Transnistria (the left bank of the Dniester) has spurs of the Podolian Plateau (Romanian: Podişul Podoliei, Ukrainian: Volyno-Podil's'ka vysochyna), (average 180 meters or 591 feet, max 275 meters or 902 feet), which are cut into by tributaries of the Dniester River. The southern half of Transnistria, the Lower Dniester Plain, can be regarded as the western end of the Eurasian steppe, and has an average elevation of 100 meters (328 ft), with a maximum of 170 meters (558 ft). The high right bank and low left bank of the Dniester are in sharp contrast here, where visibility is not impeded by forests.

About 75 percent of Moldova is covered by a soil type called black earth or chernozem. In the northern hills, more clay textured soils are found; in the south, red-earth soil is predominant. The soil becomes less fertile toward the south but can still support grape and sunflower production. The hills have woodland soils, while a small portion in southern Moldova is in the steppe zone, although most steppe areas today are cultivated. The lower reaches of the Prut and Dniester rivers and the southern river valleys are saline marshes.

Drainage in Moldova is to the south, toward the Black Sea lowlands, and eventually into the Black Sea, but only eight rivers and creeks extend more than 100 kilometers (62 miles). Moldova's main river, the Dniester, is navigable throughout almost the entire country, and in warmer winters it does not freeze over. The Prut river is a tributary of the Danube, which it joins at the far southwestern tip of the country. Over 95% of the water circulation in Moldova flows into one of the two rivers – the Prut or Dniester. Of Moldova's well-developed network of about 3,000 creeks and streams, all draining south to the Black Sea, only 246 exceed 6 mi (9.7 km) in length, and only 8 exceed 60 mi (96.6 km).

Underground water, extensively used for the country's water supply, includes about 2,200 natural springs. The terrain favors the construction of reservoirs of various sizes.

=== Extreme points ===
- The lowest point: An unnamed point on the bank of the Dniester River 2 m (6.56 ft)
- The highest point: Dealul Bălănești 430 m (1,411 ft)
- North extreme: Naslavcea
- South extreme: Giurgiulești
- West extreme: Criva
- East extreme: Palanca

== Natural habitat ==
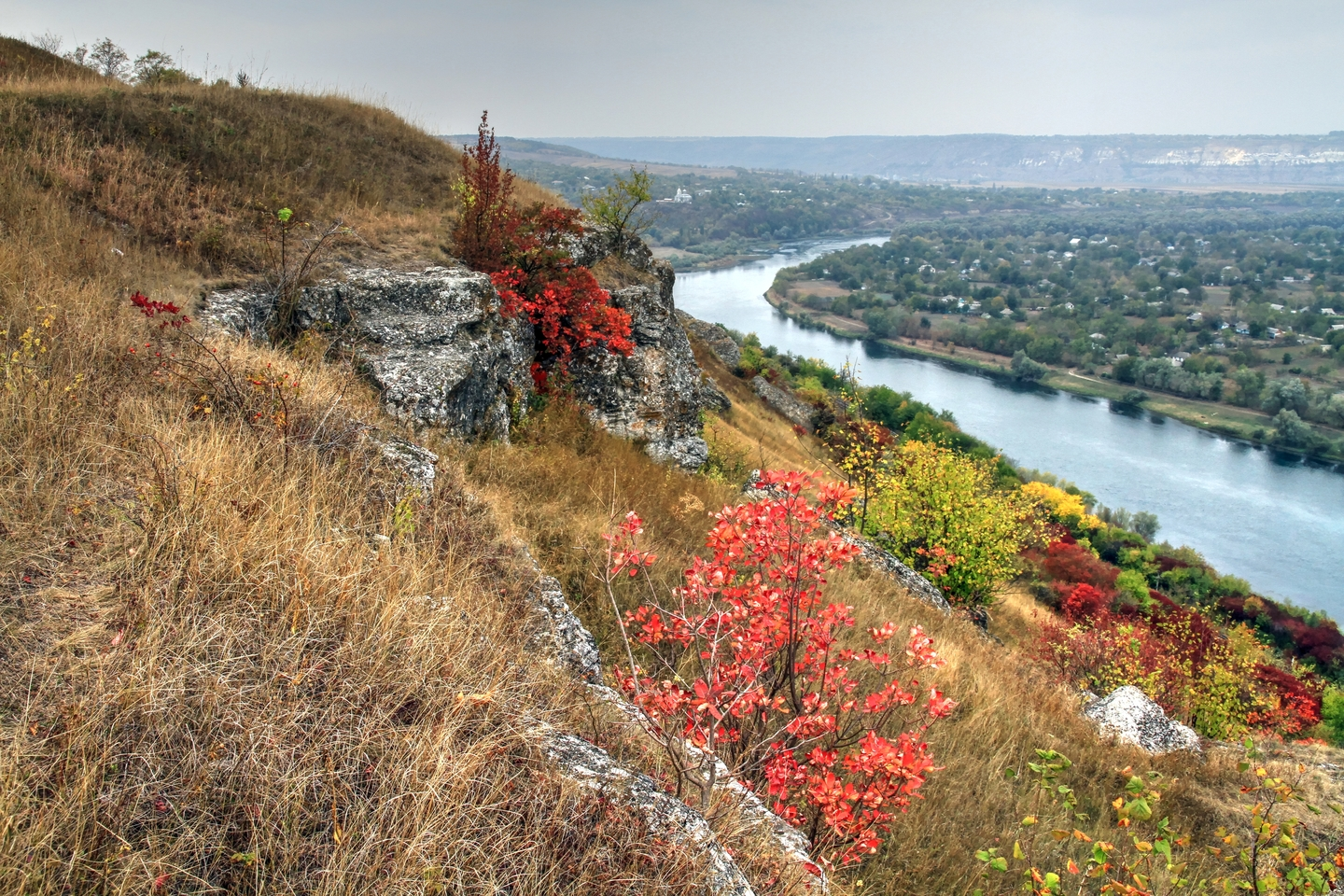
A Nistru valley view.

Moldova's natural habitat is characterized by forest steppes, a temperate-climate habitat type composed of grassland interspersed with areas of woodland or forest. A belt of forest steppes cross Eurasia from eastern Europe to Eastern Siberia, forming a transition between temperate broadleaf and mixed forests and temperate grasslands. In the 19th century, Moldova witnessed a sharp decrease in the forested areas, sacrificed for agriculture due to rich soil.

land formation	area, km^{2}	of which currently forests, km^{2}	% forests	habitat type
Northern Moldavian Hills	4,630	476	10.3%	forest steppe
Dniester–Răut Ridge	2,480	363	14.6%	forest steppe
Middle Prut Valley	2,930	312	10.6%	forest steppe
Bălți Steppe	1,920	51	2.7%	steppe
Ciuluc-Soloneț Hills	1,690	169	10.0%	forest steppe
Cornești Hills (Codru)	4,740	1,300	27.5%	forest
Lower Dniester Hills	3,040	371	12.2%	forest steppe
Lower Prut Valley	1,810	144	8.0%	forest steppe
Tigheci Hills	3,550	533	15.0%	forest steppe
Bugeac Plain	3,210	195	6.1%	steppe
part of Podolian Plateau	1,920	175	9.1%	forest steppe
part of Eurasian Steppe	1,920	140	7.3%	steppe
Total	33,840	4,228	12,5%	forest steppe

== Environment ==
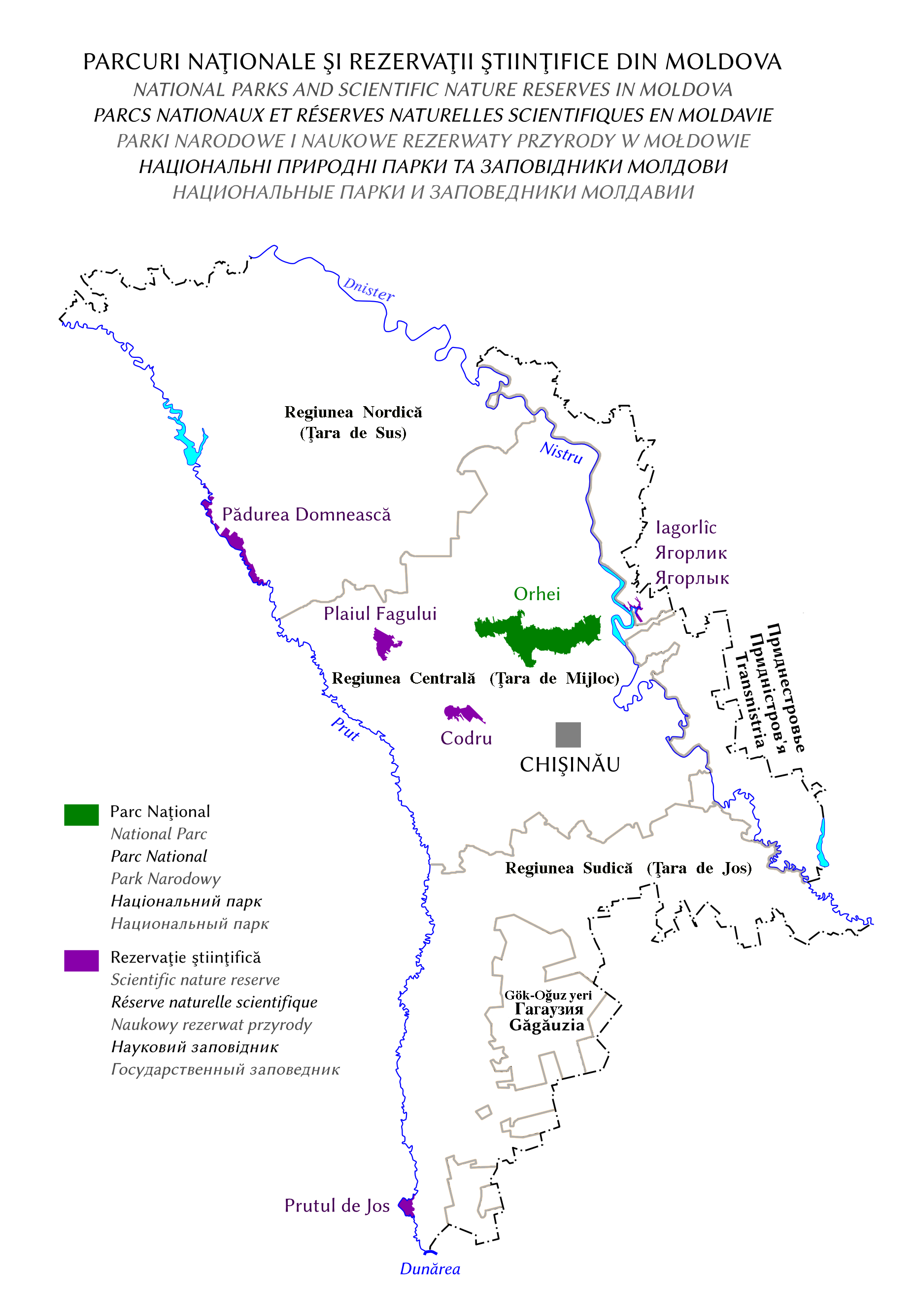
Scientific nature reserves and national parks of Moldova: National park Scientific reserves

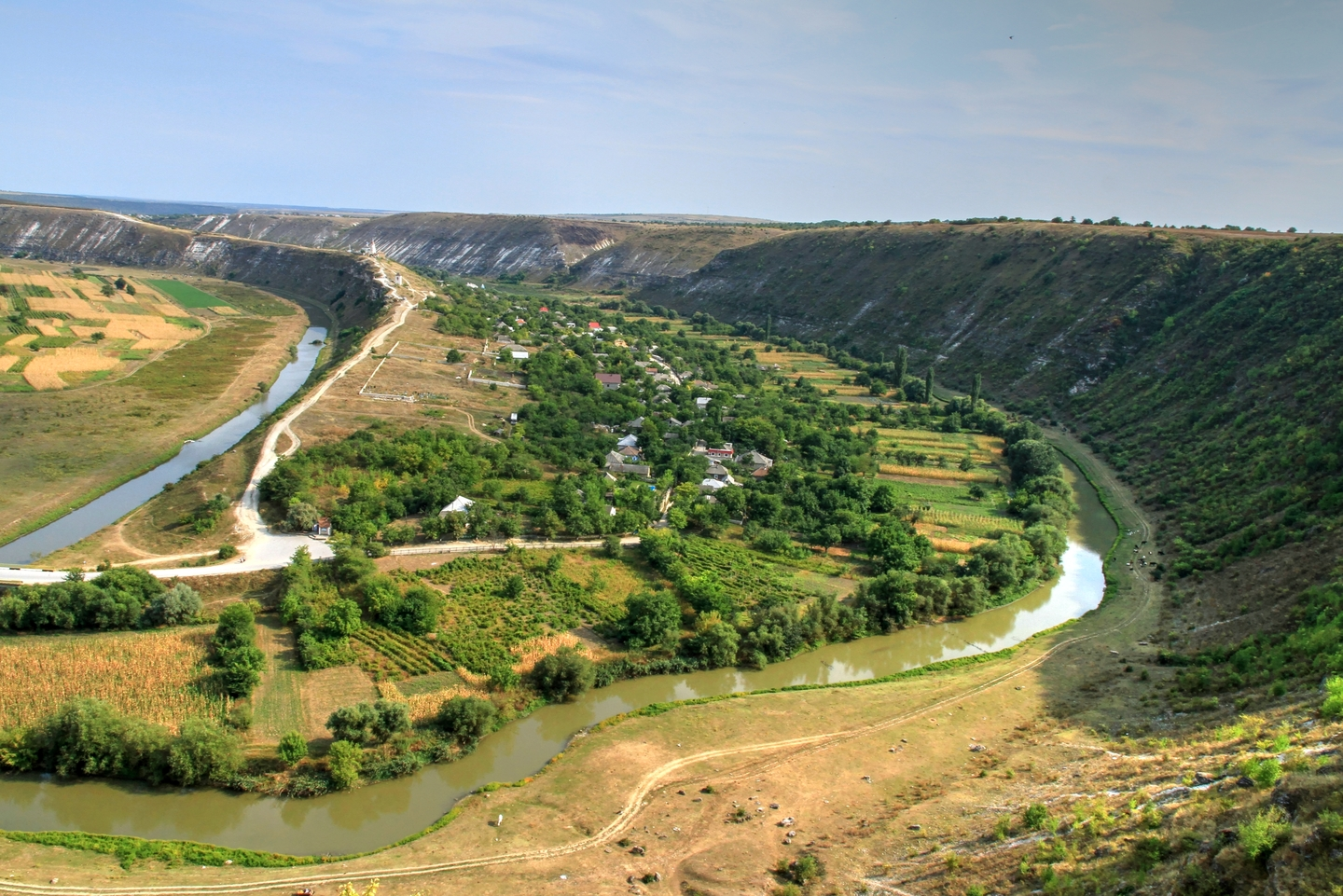
Orhei National Park

=== Historical references ===
- In the 5th century BC, Herodotus visited the countryside between the rivers Dnister and Prut and described the place as "a plain with deep black earth, rich in grass and well-irrigated".
- Lithuanian Prince Jogaila spoke of Moldavia as "a rich and fructiferous country".
- According to the testimony of Venetian Mateus de Murano, "the country was very well located, reach with cattle and all kinds of fruits, pastures are perfect".
- Rich natural resources of Moldavia always attracted nomads. Fleeing their devastating incursions, inhabitants of Moldavia left the brooded places and hid in forests. French knight Guillebert de Lannoy, who visited these places in 1421, has mentioned an insignificant population of the region: "We moved through large deserts".
- Counsellor of Hungarian King George Reihersdorf (middle of 16th century) was complaining of travel through "empty, uninhabited lands". In 1541, he produced the first geographical map (preserved to this day) of the Principality of Moldavia, with rivers Dnister and Prut shown, as well as cities and other localities, but also highlighted large steppes.
- A map of Moldavia was drawn by the German diplomat Sigismund von Herberstein. On his map one can see woodless spaces – Bălți Steppe in the north, and Bugeac Steppe in the south.
- In the 17th century, pilgrims Pavel Aleppskii (a Syrian deacon) and Ioan Lukianov (a Russian priest) traveled on their way to the Holy Land through Moldavia. These two travelers were struck by the disastrous state of the land that used to blossom: "It better be not ravaged, as no other such can be found, it may yield any kind".
- English traveler John Bell, who also visited Moldavia, and wrote about fecund soils and "small nice towns" situated next to Răut.
- Russian geographer K. Laksman described Bălți steppe at the beginning of the 19th century: "To the north is located a steppe with almost no trees at all. To the north-west the steppe is not as woodless".
- Scientist K. Arseniev mentioned that the north of Bessarabia is "a genuine mix of arid steppes with most fertile pastures, rich meadows, and gardens".
- Travelers and scholars were amazed by the contrast between rich natural resources of Moldavia/Bălți steppe and its low population in the war-torn 18th century, the pitiful state of agriculture, as well as the poverty of the local population.
- "Desert, waste, naked steppe... The settling among limitless expanses of Bălți steppe happened not "in accordance" with logic, but "against" it. The life of remote ancestors of Bălțiers was full of difficulties and crosses, but they managed to resist."
- "Moldavian fields, as described by both ancient and contemporary writers, are great in their fertility, by far surpassing the richness of the mountains" (Dimitrie Cantemir, Descriptio Moldaviae)
- "Will someone describes Bessarabian steppes, indeed, they do merit a description. However for this, one needs the talent of unforgettable Gogol, who has so beautifully depicted us the steppes of his homeland. And Bessarabian steppes are not less beautiful." (Constantin Stamati-Ciurea)

=== Current issues ===
Moldova's communist-era environmental legacy, like that of many other former Soviet republics, is one of environmental degradation. Agricultural practices such as overuse of pesticides and artificial fertilizers were intended to increase agricultural output at all costs, without regard for the consequences. As a result, Moldova's soil and groundwater were contaminated by lingering chemicals, some of which (including DDT) have been banned in the West.

Such practices continue in Moldova to the present day. In the early 1990s, use of pesticides in Moldova averaged approximately twenty times that of other former Soviet republics and Western nations. Also, poor farming methods, such as destroying forests to plant vineyards, have contributed to the extensive soil erosion to which the country's rugged topography is already prone.

==== Water quality and wastewater ====
Water quality is one of Moldova's major environmental problems, particularly in relation to municipal wastewater, rural sanitation and pollution of small rivers. According to a 2025 EU4Green Recovery East assessment, only about 10% of Moldovan localities benefited from centralized sewerage services, with a large difference between urban areas, where connectivity was estimated at about 55%, and rural communities, where access was about 3%. The same assessment found that Moldova had 272 documented wastewater treatment plants, but only 31 of them, or about 11%, achieved normative treatment standards for basic discharge indicators such as biochemical oxygen demand, chemical oxygen demand and suspended solids.

Limited wastewater collection and treatment contributes to the pollution of surface and groundwater. The EU4Green assessment noted that many wastewater facilities rely on biological ponds with limited treatment efficiency, that aging sewerage networks suffer from infiltration and structural deterioration, and that industrial pre-treatment remains inconsistent across the country. Sludge management was also identified as a concern, as sludge is often stored untreated on land, creating additional environmental risks.

Surface-water monitoring has also shown contamination by several groups of pollutants. A 2023 EU4Environment surface-water survey in the Prut River basin analysed biological and physico-chemical quality elements, including pH, conductivity, dissolved oxygen, turbidity, biochemical oxygen demand, chemical oxygen demand, nutrients and other chemical parameters. The survey recorded elevated values of several parameters at individual monitoring stations, including ammonium nitrogen, nitrites, nitrates, orthophosphates, total phosphorus, sulphates, chlorides, sodium, potassium and anionic surfactants. Low water levels in many investigated rivers were also reported, increasing the concentration of chemical parameters and worsening biological results.

Official surface-water monitoring in Moldova is carried out by the Environment Agency through its Water Quality Laboratory, which monitors the surface waters of the Dniester and the Danube-Prut-Black Sea river basin districts. In 2026, ZIUZEA SRL, a Moldovan company working on nature-based water treatment solutions, announced that it had developed what it described as the first interactive surface-water quality map of Moldova. According to the company, the platform uses open-source and government data to make information about surface-water quality easier to access and understand, and is intended to be expanded with additional features showing water-quality dynamics, data providers, contamination levels and other indicators. The company also stated that the platform would be used to present floating wetland installations and demonstrate the role of nature-based solutions in water treatment and ecological restoration. The public map page lists monitoring locations and distinguishes between government-data points and floating wetland installations.

The problem is closely connected to rural water supply and sanitation. World Bank project documents state that Moldova has large rural-urban gaps in access to water supply and sanitation services, and that nearly one million Moldovans rely on shallow, often polluted and drought-prone wells for drinking water. The same document reported that about 80% of wells were not compliant with drinking-water norms, including due to nitrates and E. coli, and that sewer systems served only 3.6% of the rural population compared with 76.3% of urban residents.

Modernization of sewerage networks, rehabilitation of wastewater treatment plants, improved sludge management, better control of agricultural runoff, expanded monitoring of surface and groundwater and wider public access to environmental data are considered important measures for reducing Moldova's water pollution and improving public health.

== International environmental agreements ==
party to: Air Pollution, Air Pollution-Persistent Organic Pollutants, Biodiversity, Climate Change, Climate Change-Kyoto Protocol, Desertification, Endangered Species, Hazardous Wastes, Ozone Layer Protection, Ship Pollution, Wetlands

signed, but not ratified: none of the selected agreements

== See also ==
- Moldova
- List of cities in Moldova
