= Codru (forest) =

Forests in central Moldova

Coordinates: 47.1000°N 28.3000°E

Moldavian Plateau
Topography
Bukovinian Subcarpathians; Moldavian Subcarpathians Suceava Plateau; Dniester Hills; Moldavian Plain; Bârlad Plateau; Central Moldavian Plateau Bălți Steppe; Bugeac Steppe
Hydrography
Danube; Siret (Moldova, Suceava); Prut; Dniester (Răut); Black Sea
Climate
Romania; Moldova
Flora & Fauna
Flora of Romania; Flora of Moldova; List of mammals in Romania; List of mammals in Moldova; Protected areas in Romania; Protected areas in Moldova

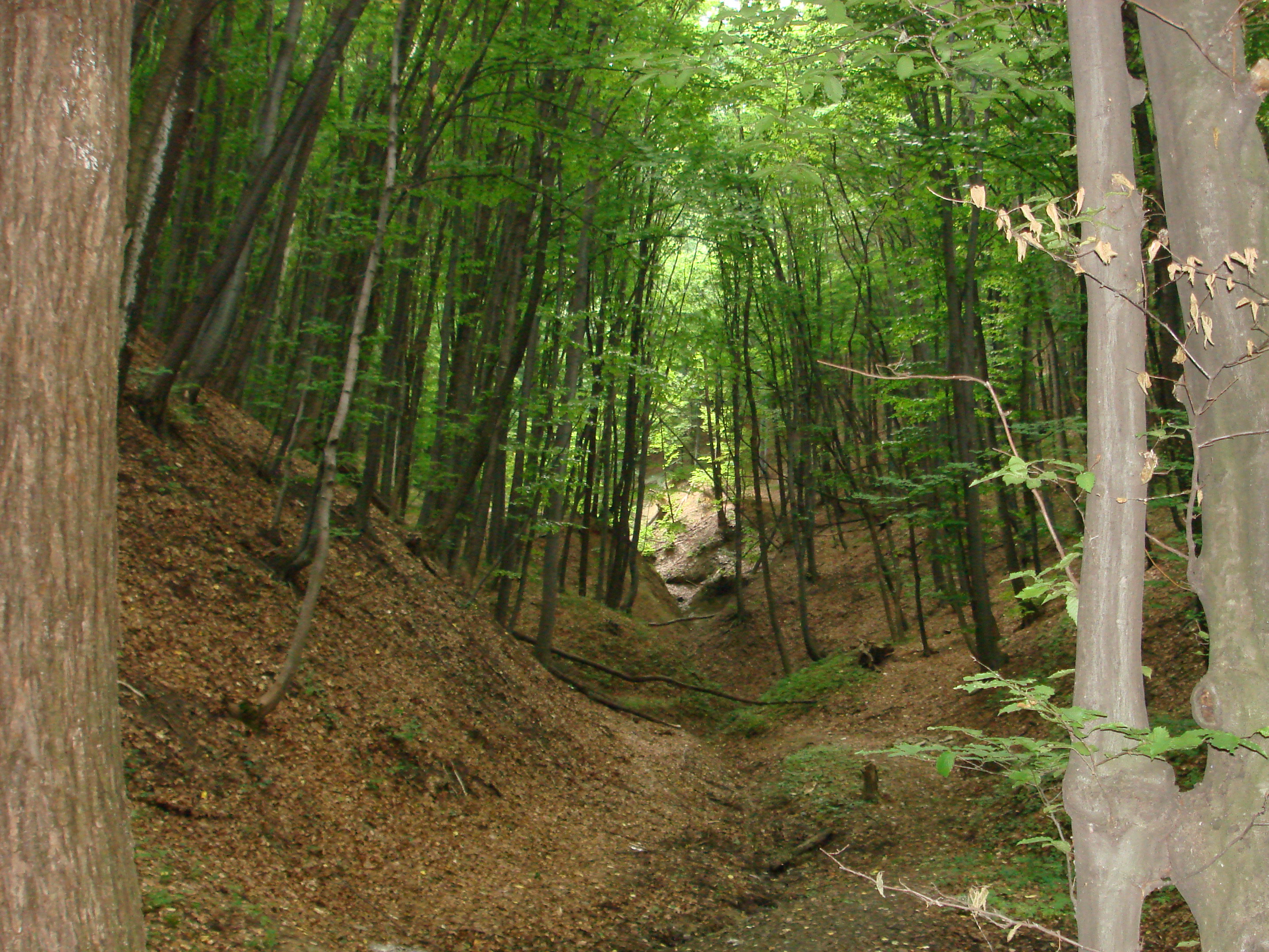
Codrii, Dolna Landscape Reserve

Codru (plural forms: codri, codrii; 'forest' or 'wood') is the area of ancient forests in the hilly Central Moldavian Plateau.

== Etymology ==
The Romanian word codru is one of the synonyms for 'forest', 'woods'. It may have a collective meaning of 'forests'. In particular, it means 'old and dense woods'.

== History ==
During the Middle Ages most of the Principality of Moldavia's hills were forested, and the forested area in general was referred to as codri, with bigger regional forests having individual names, such as Codrii Cosminului (Cosmin Codrii), Codrii Plonini (Plonini Codrii), Codrii Hotinului (Hotin Codrii; also, Pădurea Hotinului, Hotin Forest), Codrii Orheiului (Orhei Codrii), Codrii Lăpușnei (Lăpușna Codrii).

Although the rolling hills represent about 80%–90% of the territory of Moldova, the forested area has decreased since the 18th century due to intensive agriculture of the fertile land, to about 20% plus about 5.6% of forest steppe. At the 21st century the area of the forest has been continuously decreasing, both in surface and ecologically. Despite the fact that there are still several big forests that have been preserved, including some designated as national parks, the country currently suffers from acute insufficiency of forests (with respect to its normal ecology), translated into poorer and less water for human and irrigation use.

There are projects, such as Codru Quest, aimed on the reducing the degradation of Moldavan forest ecosystem.

== Geography ==
The highest point in Moldova, Bălănești Hill (Dealul Bălănești; 429 m or 1,407 ft) is in the Cornești Hills, located between Prut and Răut rivers, in the core codri area.

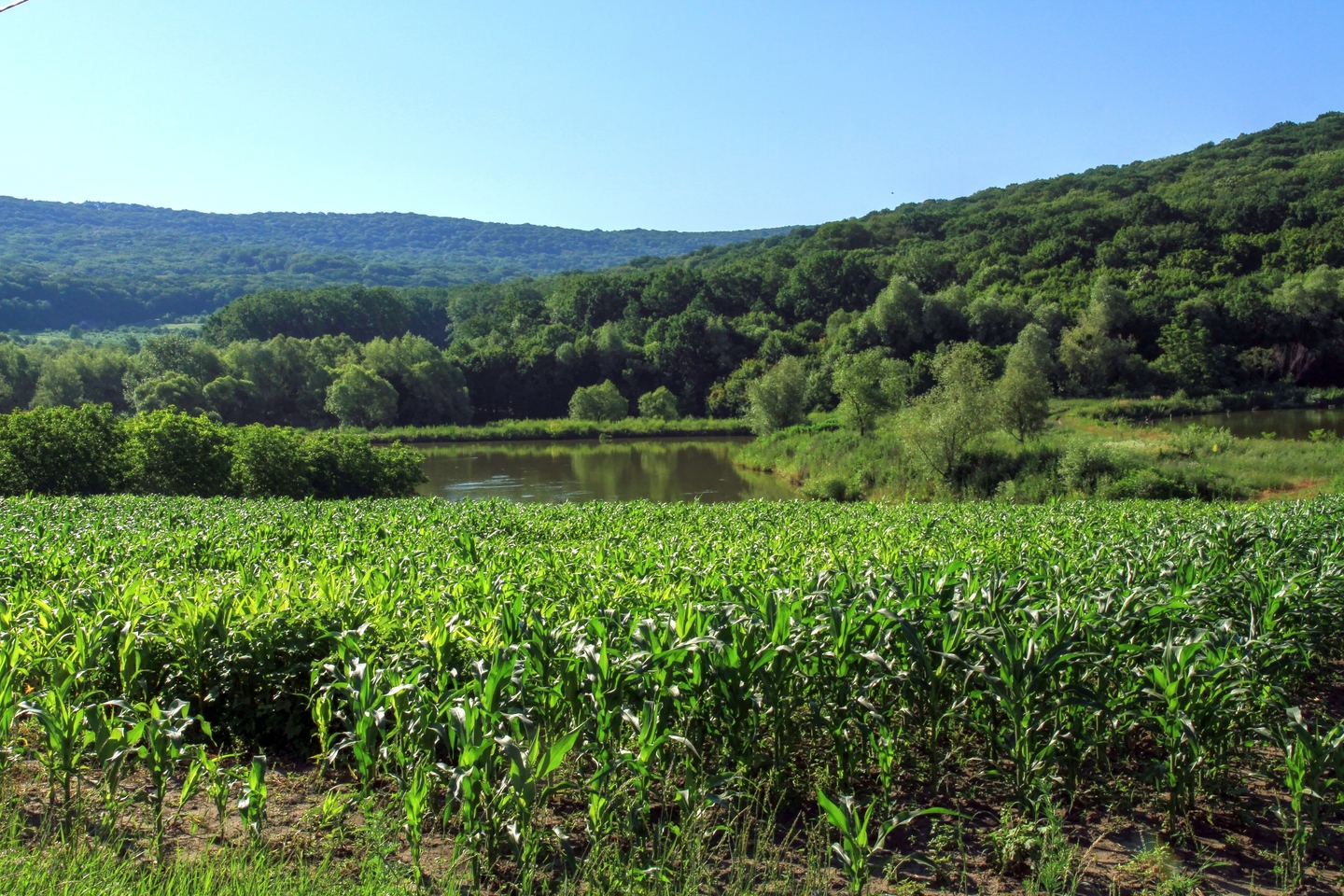
The Codru Reserve

The scientific Codru Reserve was established in Moldavian SSR in 1971. A part of it is a strict nature reserve. Other parts of reserve includes are accessible for tourists. In particular, there is the Nature Museum with stuffed animals of all kinds of fauna met in the reserve.

There is also the Orhei National Park in the vicinity of Orhei. It includes several named protected areas: a historical and archaeological complex Old Orhei, the Trebujeni Landscape Reserve, the Curchi forest with the Curchi Monastery, the Țigănești Landscape Reserve with the Țigănești Monastery.

== Cultural impact ==
The word "codru" has legendary resonances for Moldovans, because the formation and evolution of the Romanian ethnos Moldavia is linked to the forests.

Codru is a key element of a number of Romanian sayings, such as "to dream green codri" means "to dream about impossible things"; "as in codru" means "carelessly, unhindered"; "to go into codri" or "to take a codru path" means "to become an outlaw"; "there is no codru without wolves" meaning "there are both good and bad people".

There is a network of tourist routes "Dor de Cordu" ("Longing for Codru") established with the support of UNDP Moldova.
