= Jijia Plain =

Geographic area in northeast Romania

Moldavian Plateau
Topography
Bukovinian Subcarpathians; Moldavian Subcarpathians Suceava Plateau; Dniester Hills; Moldavian Plain; Bârlad Plateau; Central Moldavian Plateau Bălți Steppe; Bugeac Steppe
Hydrography
Danube; Siret (Moldova, Suceava); Prut; Dniester (Răut); Black Sea
Climate
Romania; Moldova
Flora & Fauna
Flora of Romania; Flora of Moldova; List of mammals in Romania; List of mammals in Moldova; Protected areas in Romania; Protected areas in Moldova

Jijia Plain (Romanian: Câmpia Jijiei) is a geographic area in northeast Romania, occupying most of Botoșani County and parts of Iași County. Despite the name, it is not a flatland, but a region dotted with hills, part of the Moldavian Plateau. In Romania sometimes it is also called the Moldavian Plain, however one should be warned that in Moldova the latter term is used as a synonym for the Bălți steppe together with the Middle Prut Valley, which have a relief and natural vegetation very similar to that of the Jijia Plain.

The Jijia Plain has altitudes of c. 200 m (660 ft), lower than the surrounding Suceava Plateau, Dniester Hills, and Bârlad Plateau. The surrounding hills are characterized by deep gorges, and the term plains is employed to denote the fact that the area in-between the hill formations is visibly leaner and less slanted. The natural vegetation of this area of smooth hills is silvosteppe (forest-steppe). Nowadays it is intensely farmed.

The Jijia River is a tributary to the river Prut.

The region is a traditional agricultural area, favored by the black earth (earth with a very high natural fertility). Crops, vegetables, technical plants (such as tobacco), fruit trees (such as apple trees), fodder for the livestock, and occasionally grapes, potatoes, and berry shrubs are cultivated. The agriculture has an overwhelming dominance over the traditional vegetation, (deciduous) forest steppes. Traditional wildlife – wolves, foxes, rabbits, boars, roes, storks, geese, ducks – are very rarely found outside a few remaining forests. A traditional horse raising area, the Moldavian Plains in the last century has specialized in livestock (horses, cows, sheep), and poultry.
