= Bălți Steppe =

Coordinates: 47°46′N 27°50′E

Moldavian Plateau
Topography
Bukovinian Subcarpathians; Moldavian Subcarpathians Suceava Plateau; Dniester Hills; Moldavian Plain; Bârlad Plateau; Central Moldavian Plateau Bălți Steppe; Bugeac Steppe
Hydrography
Danube; Siret (Moldova, Suceava); Prut; Dniester (Răut); Black Sea
Climate
Romania; Moldova
Flora & Fauna
Flora of Romania; Flora of Moldova; List of mammals in Romania; List of mammals in Moldova; Protected areas in Romania; Protected areas in Moldova

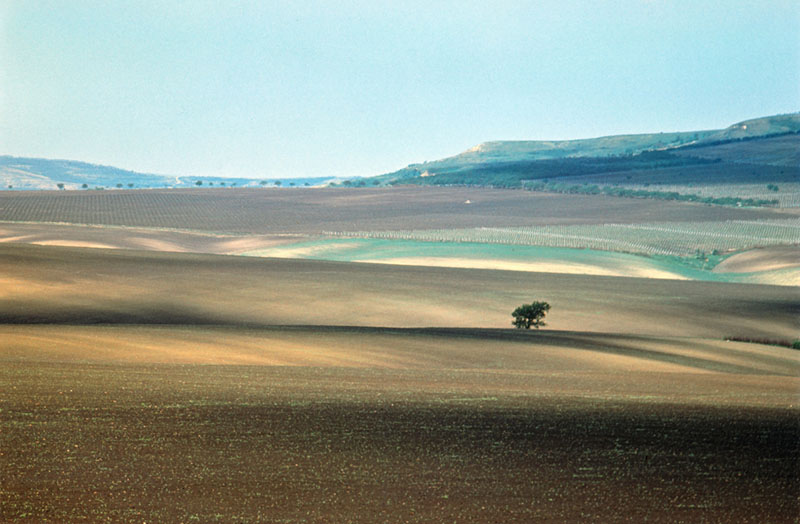
Balti steppe, 1980

The Bălți Steppe (Romanian: Stepa Bălțului) is a hilly area with few trees (apart from those near rivers Dniestr, Răut and numerous lakes and creeks), dominated by agriculturally cultivated land, and occasionally by grasses and shrubs, in the northern part of Moldova. It is characterised by moderate but unstable seasons, generally hot summers and cold winters.

The Bălți Steppe has a total surface of 1,920 km^{2}, 2.7 per cent (51 km^{2}) of it are forests. The region, as the rest of Moldova, is traditionally an agricultural area, favored by several factors, such as the chernozem (black earth).

The untouched natural richness of the northern Moldavian region became known as Bălți steppe only in the beginning of the last century.

== Span and topography ==
As a geographic area Bălți steppe is one of the three components of the Moldavian Plain, which in turn is one of the six components of the Moldavian Plateau. Despite the name, Bălți steppe is not a flatland, but a region dotted with hills.

In Moldova, Bălți steppe, 1,920 km^{2}, and Middle Prut Valley, 2,930 km^{2} are sometimes together referred to as Moldavian Plain, however one should be warned that in Romania the latter term is used as a synonym for the Jijia Plain. Before 1940 the term used to mean Jijia Plain plus Middle Prut Valley plus Bălți steppe, because the three regions have an identical relief and natural vegetation. To make the things even more complicated, in Moldova sometimes Bălți steppe and Middle Prut Valley are lumped together into one term, Bălți steppe. Together, they cover the municipality of Bălți, the districts of Glodeni, Rîșcani, and Fălești, as well as parts of Drochia, Sângerei, and Ungheni districts.

The waters of the Bălți steppe fall into the Răut river, while those of the Middle Prut Valley fall into the Prut river.

Bălți steppe has altitudes of ca. 200 m, lower than the surrounding Central Moldavian Plateau (to its south), and Dniester Hills (to its north and east). The surrounding hills are characterized by deep gorges, and the terms plain and steppe are employed to denote the fact that the area in-between the hill formations is visibly more lean and less slant.

== Vegetation and agriculture ==
The traditional natural vegetation of this area of smooth hills was forest steppe. Nowadays, however, it is intensely farmed, and thus is rendered as a steppe.

The region is a traditional agricultural area, favored by several factors, such as the black earth (earth with a very high natural fertility), the tradition, and a high degree of deforestation that occurred in the 19th century. Over 80% of the land is used for intensive agriculture, and less than 3% are forests.

Crops, vegetables, commercial plants (such as tobacco), fruit trees (such as apple trees), livestock fodder, and occasionally grapes, potatoes, and berry shrubs are cultivated in the region. The agriculture overwhelmingly dominates traditional vegetation, (deciduous) forests, and occasionally the forest steppes. Region's wildlife includes rabbits, roes, storks, geese and ducks, however in the last half-century these species populations declined in numbers because there are only few remaining forest habitats remaining. A traditional horse breeding area, in the last century the Bălți steppe has specialized in livestock (cows, sheep), and poultry.

Two varieties of winter barley "Auriu" and "Sokor", produced by the Bălți Research Institute "Selecția", specialized in field crops. They are very productive in the conditions of unstable moistening of the Bălți steppe.

== Poets and personalities about Bălți Steppe ==
- In the 5th century BC, Herodotus visited the countryside between the rivers Dniester and Prut and described the place as "a plain with deep black earth, rich in grass and well irrigated".
- Lithuanian Prince Jogaila spoke of Moldavia as "a rich and fructiferous country".
- According to the testimony of Venetian Mateus de Murano, "the country was very well located, rich with cattle and all kinds of fruits, pastures are perfect".
- Rich natural resources of Moldavia/Bălți steppe always attracted nomads. Fleeing their devastating incursions, inhabitants of Moldavia/Bălți steppe left the brooded places and hid in forests. French knight Guilbert de Lannoy, who visited these places in 1421, has mentioned insignificant population of the region: "we moved through large deserts".
- Counsellor of Hungarian King George Reihersdorf (middle of the 16th century) was complaining of travel through "empty, uninhabited lands". In 1541, he produced the first geographical map (preserved to this day) of the Principality of Moldavia, with rivers Dnister and Prut shown, as well as cities and other localities, but also highlighted large steppes.
- A map of Moldavia was drawn by the German diplomat Sigismund von Herberstein. On his map one can see woodless spaces - Bălți steppe in the north, and Bugeac Steppe in the south.
- In the 17th century, pilgrims Pavel Aleppskii (a Syrian deacon) and Ioan Lukianov (a Russian priest) traveled on their way to the Holy Land through Moldavia/the Bălți steppe. These two travelers were stricken by the disastrous state of the land that used to blossom: "It better be not ravaged, as no other such can be found, it may yield any kind".
- English traveler John Bell, who also visited Moldavia/Bălți steppe, and wrote about fecund soils and "small nice towns" - speaking of Bălți and other localities situated next to Răut.
- Russian geographer K. Laksman described Bălți steppe in the beginning of the 19th century: "To the north is located a steppe with almost no trees at all. To the north-west the steppe is not as woodless".
- Scientist K. Arseniev mentioned that the north of Bessarabia is "a genuine mix of arid steppes with most fertile pastures, rich meadows and gardens".
- Travelers and scholars were amazed by the contrast between rich natural resources of Moldavia/Bălți steppe and its low population in war torn 18th century, pitiful state of agriculture, as well as the poverty of the local population.
- "Desert, waste, naked steppe... The settling among limitless expanses of Bălți steppe happened not "in accordance" with logic, but "against" it. The life of remote ancestors of Bălțiers was full of difficulties and crosses, but they managed to resist."
- "Moldavian fields, as described by both ancient and contemporary writers, are great in their fertility, by far surpassing the richness of the mountains" (Dimitrie Cantemir, Descriptio Moldaviae)
- "Will someone describe Bessarabian steppes, indeed, they do merit a description. However for this, one needs the talent of unforgettable Gogol, who has so beautifully depicted us the steppes of his homeland. And Bessarabian steppes are not less beautiful." (Constantin Stamati-Ciurea)

== Population ==
First human settlements appeared on the territory of Bălți steppe in ancient times. Archaeological excavations witness that the humans settled here as early as Stone Age.
