= Bugeac Steppe =

Coordinates: 46.0000°N 29.0000°E

Moldavian Plateau
Topography
Bukovinian Subcarpathians; Moldavian Subcarpathians Suceava Plateau; Dniester Hills; Moldavian Plain; Bârlad Plateau; Central Moldavian Plateau Bălți Steppe; Bugeac Steppe
Hydrography
Danube; Siret (Moldova, Suceava); Prut; Dniester (Răut); Black Sea
Climate
Romania; Moldova
Flora & Fauna
Flora of Romania; Flora of Moldova; List of mammals in Romania; List of mammals in Moldova; Protected areas in Romania; Protected areas in Moldova

The Bugeac Steppe, Budjak Steppe or Budzhak Steppe (Romanian: Stepa Bugeacului; Ukrainian: Буджацький степ, romanized: Budžac'kyj step) is a steppe located in the south of Ukraine and Moldova from the Dniester to Prut rivers reaching down to the Black Sea. The Bugeac Steppe has a total surface of 3,210 km^{2}, of which 6.1% is forest.

== Wild edible plants and traditional knowledge ==
The Bugeac Steppe region possesses a rich ethnobotanical heritage. A 2015 study conducted in three rural settlements in the Comrat district (Budjak, Dezghingea, and Topal) documented 38 wild edible plant species from 33 genera and 17 families that have been traditionally consumed by local communities. These plants represent roughly 5.3% of the 715 plant species registered in the region. The most utilized species belong to the families Rosaceae, Asteraceae, Fabaceae, Amaranthaceae, and Malvaceae, collectively accounting for over 60% of the documented edible plants.

Ecological analysis of the native flora reveals that hemicryptophytes (47.3%) and therophytes (28.9%) are the predominant life forms, indicating a climate with hydric deficit. From a phytogeographic perspective, Mediterranean (36.8%) and Eurasian (31.6%) geoelements constitute the majority of wild edible species. While local inhabitants maintain significant traditional knowledge about these plants, contemporary usage has declined substantially, with less than 30% of recorded species still actively harvested. The most commonly collected plants in recent times include nettle (Urtica dioica), Rumex acetosella, and wild fruits such as blackthorn (Prunus spinosa) and dog rose (Rosa canina), which are used for both culinary and medicinal purposes.

== Grassland vegetation ==
The Bugeac Steppe region contains distinctive grassland communities characterized by savannah-like vegetation dominated by Bothriochloa ischaemum (yellow bluestem). Research conducted in the region shows that these grasslands include both original (primary) and human-modified plant communities that have been impacted by excessive grazing These plant communities typically grow on sunny hillsides with limestone-rich, rocky, dry soils that contain few nutrients. According to a 2018 study, the grassland communities in the Bugeac Steppe region have a more xerophilous character than those in northern Moldova, containing distinctive species such as Euphorbia seguieriana, E. stepposa, Bassia prostrata, Phlomis pungens, and Potentilla incana, forming the association Euphorbio (seguieriana)-Bothriochloetum ischaemii. Ecological analysis reveals that the current steppe vegetation covers about 65,000 hectares, though much of the original Bugeac steppe ecosystem has been converted to agricultural land, with present pastures consisting mainly of degraded grasslands or abandoned agricultural lands.

== See also ==
- Tarutyne steppe
