= Central Moldavian Plateau =

Plateau in eastern Romania

Moldavian Plateau
Topography
Bukovinian Subcarpathians; Moldavian Subcarpathians Suceava Plateau; Dniester Hills; Moldavian Plain; Bârlad Plateau; Central Moldavian Plateau Bălți Steppe; Bugeac Steppe
Hydrography
Danube; Siret (Moldova, Suceava); Prut; Dniester (Răut); Black Sea
Climate
Romania; Moldova
Flora & Fauna
Flora of Romania; Flora of Moldova; List of mammals in Romania; List of mammals in Moldova; Protected areas in Romania; Protected areas in Moldova

The Central Moldavian Plateau (Romanian: Podişul Moldovei Centrale), or Codru Massif (Romanian: Masivul Codru) is a geographic area in Moldova. It is the central and SE part of the Moldavian Plateau. It has elevations that in the N-S direction decrease in altitude from 400 m to under 200 m.

The Central Moldavian Plateau is composed of:

- Ciuluc-Soloneţ Hills (Romanian: Dealurile Ciuluc-Soloneţ), the north along the right side of the Răut river, 1,690 km²
- Corneşti Hills (Romanian: Dealurile Corneştilor), also known as Cordi Hills (Romanian: Dealurile Codrilor), 4,740 km²
- Lower Dniester Hills, or South Bessarabia Plateau (Romanian: Dealurile Nistrului Inferior; Podişul Basarabiei de Sud), to the south of the Botna river, 3,040 km²
- Tigheci Hills (Romanian: Dealurile Tigheciului), in the south along the left side of the Prut river, 3,550 km²
- between the latter and the Prut river lies the Lower Prut Valley (Romanian: Valea Prutului Inferior), 1,810 km²

The natural vegetation of the Central Moldavian Plateau is characterized by forests, known as Codru (singular) or Codri (plural). It is also an area proper for vineyards.

== Bibliography ==
- Concept of National Ecological Network of the Republic of Moldova
