= Dniester Hills =

Landform in Moldova and Ukraine

Coordinates: 48°15′00″N 27°20′00″E

Moldavian Plateau
Topography
Bukovinian Subcarpathians; Moldavian Subcarpathians Suceava Plateau; Dniester Hills; Moldavian Plain; Bârlad Plateau; Central Moldavian Plateau Bălți Steppe; Bugeac Steppe
Hydrography
Danube; Siret (Moldova, Suceava); Prut; Dniester (Răut); Black Sea
Climate
Romania; Moldova
Flora & Fauna
Flora of Romania; Flora of Moldova; List of mammals in Romania; List of mammals in Moldova; Protected areas in Romania; Protected areas in Moldova

Dniester Hills (Romanian: Dealurile Nistrului), also known as the Northern Moldavian Plateau (Romanian: Podişul Moldovei de Nord) is a geographic area that comprises most of the northern Moldova, and parts of the Chernivtsi Oblast of Ukraine. Dniester Hills are the N and NE component of the Moldavian Plateau.

Dniester Hills run and ridge along the Dniester River, from the Colachin river, an affluent of the Prut river, and the Plonini Forest to the point where Dniester receives its tributary Răut. The river Dniester in turn bounds Dniester Hills to the N and E, and separates them from the Podolian Plateau. Dniester Hills are separated from the rest of the Moldavian Plateau (Suceava Plateau, Jijia Plain, Bălți steppe, Central Moldavian Plateau) by the passages formed in the valley of the Răut River and its tributaries, and partly by those of the Prut River and its tributaries.

Dniester Hills have average elevations between 250 and 300 meters, with the highest peak reaching 347 metres (1,138 ft). The hills are composed of:

- Hotin Plateau (Romanian: Podişul Hotin) in the NW edge/alongation, containing the Plonini Forest, the Hotin Forest, as well as the Şipeniţ Valley (Romanian: Valea Şipeniţului)
- Dniester Ridge, or Dniester Hillock (Romanian: Colinele Nistrului), also called Dniester-Răut Ridge or "the Ridge between the Dniester and the Răut", (Romanian: Colinele dintre Nistru si Răut), 2,480 km^{2}, in the SE edge/alongation
- Northern Moldavian Hills, or Northern Bessarabian Plateau (Romanian: Podişul Moldovei de nord, Platoul Basarabiei de Nord), the central part of the Dniester Hills, 4,630 km^{2}.

Due to the phenomenon of ridges along the right side bank of the river Dniester, the waters falling directly in the Dniester are only several small creeks. The NW part of the Dniester Hills, is characterized by numerous creeks sourcing only one or two hills away from the Dniester but falling into the river Prut, a tributary of Danube. The SE part of the Dniester Hills is characterized by creeks falling into the river Răut, which itself afterwards falls into the Dniester.
