= Moldavian Plain =

Geographic area in northeastern Romania

Moldavian Plateau
Topography
Bukovinian Subcarpathians; Moldavian Subcarpathians Suceava Plateau; Dniester Hills; Moldavian Plain; Bârlad Plateau; Central Moldavian Plateau Bălți Steppe; Bugeac Steppe
Hydrography
Danube; Siret (Moldova, Suceava); Prut; Dniester (Răut); Black Sea
Climate
Romania; Moldova
Flora & Fauna
Flora of Romania; Flora of Moldova; List of mammals in Romania; List of mammals in Moldova; Protected areas in Romania; Protected areas in Moldova

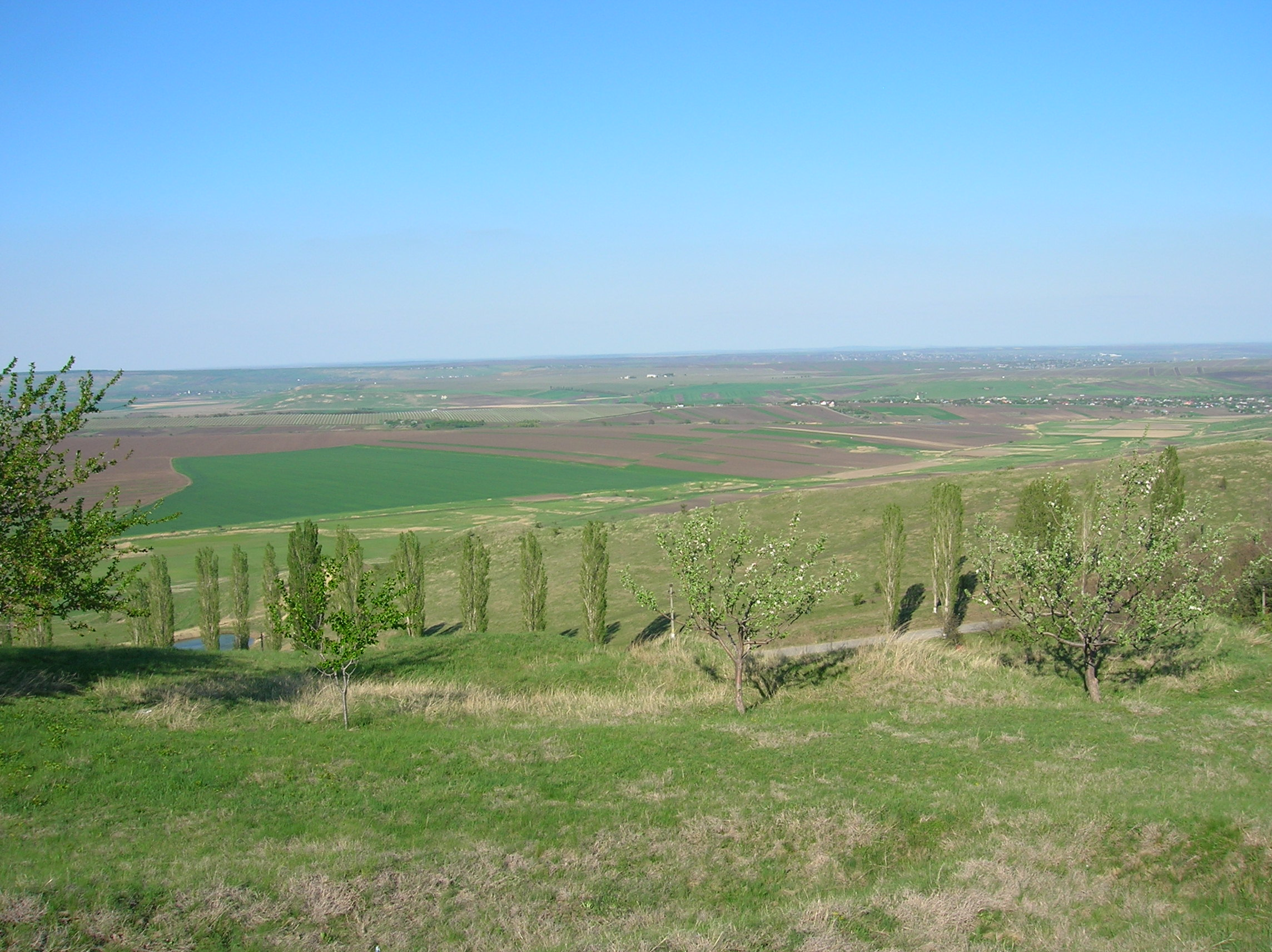
Moldavian Plain near Cucuteni

Moldavian Plain (Romanian: Câmpia Moldovei) is a geographic area in the north east of Romania, one of the components of the Moldavian Plateau. Despite the name, the Moldavian Plain is not flat, but rather a region dotted with hills, part of the Moldavian Plateau.

The Plain is situated in the center-north part of the Moldavian Plateau. It has elevations of c. 200 m (660 ft), and is composed of the Upper and the Lower Jijia Plains.

Before 1940, the term used to mean the Jijia Plain together with the Middle Prut Valley and the Bălți Steppe, because the three regions have an identical relief and natural vegetation. To make the things even more complicated, in Moldova sometimes the Bălți Steppe and the Middle Prut Valley are lumped together into one term, Bălți Steppe.

The Moldavian Plain is surrounded from all three sides by hills: the Suceava Plateau to the west, the Northern Moldovan Plateau to the north, and the Bârlad Plateau to the south. The Plain is limited to the east by the Prut River In the south of the western part lies the valley of the Jijia River, a tributary of the Prut.

The region is a traditional agricultural area, favored by several factors, such as the black earth (earth with a very high natural fertility), a high degree of deforestation that occurred in the 19th century, and the tradition.

Crops, vegetables, industrial plants (such as tobacco), fruit trees (such as apple trees), fodder for livestock, and occasionally grapes, potatoes, and berry shrubs are cultivated. The agriculture is overwhelmingly dominant over the traditional vegetation, (deciduous) forests, and only occasionally forest steppes.

Traditional wildlife - wolves, foxes, rabbits, boars, roes, storks, geese, ducks - are very rarely found outside a few remaining forests. A traditional horse growing area, the Moldavian Plain since the beginning of the 20th century has specialized in livestock (cows, sheep) and poultry.

== Bibliography ==
- Istoria peșterilor sau taina din pădurile satului Condrita (in Romanian), archived from the original on 27 September 2011
- Podișul Moldovei (in Romanian)
