= Bârlad Plateau =

Plateau in eastern Romania

Coordinates: 46.64°N 27.32°E

Moldavian Plateau
Topography
Bukovinian Subcarpathians; Moldavian Subcarpathians Suceava Plateau; Dniester Hills; Moldavian Plain; Bârlad Plateau; Central Moldavian Plateau Bălți Steppe; Bugeac Steppe
Hydrography
Danube; Siret (Moldova, Suceava); Prut; Dniester (Răut); Black Sea
Climate
Romania; Moldova
Flora & Fauna
Flora of Romania; Flora of Moldova; List of mammals in Romania; List of mammals in Moldova; Protected areas in Romania; Protected areas in Moldova

Bârlad Plateau (Romanian: Podișului Bârladului) is a geographic area in eastern Romania. It is the south central part of the Moldavian Plateau and covers an area of 9,100 km^{2} (3,500 sq mi). Although it occasionally has heights over 500 m (1,600 ft), it is generally sloped from north at 400 m (1,300 ft) to the south at 200 m (660 ft).

The river Bârlad and its tributaries have cut in it the northern part of the Bârlad plateau, which sometimes is called Podișul Central Moldovenesc, a term that can be easily confused with the reserved term Podișul Moldovei Centrale (in English both translate as the Central Moldavian Plateau). The northernmost hill formation (edge) is called the Iași Ridge (Romanian: Coasta Iașilor). Other parts of the Bârlad Plateau:

- Tutova Hills (Romanian: Colinele Tutovei),
- Fălciu Hills (Romanian: Dealurile Fălciului),
- Covurlui Plateau (Romanian: Podișul Covurlui), and
- Elanului Depression (Romanian: Depresiunea Elanului).

Bârlad's climate is generally temperate, with yearly averages hovering around 7–10 °C (45–50 °F) for temperature and 500–700 mm (20–28 in) of rainfall.
