= Moldavian Subcarpathians =

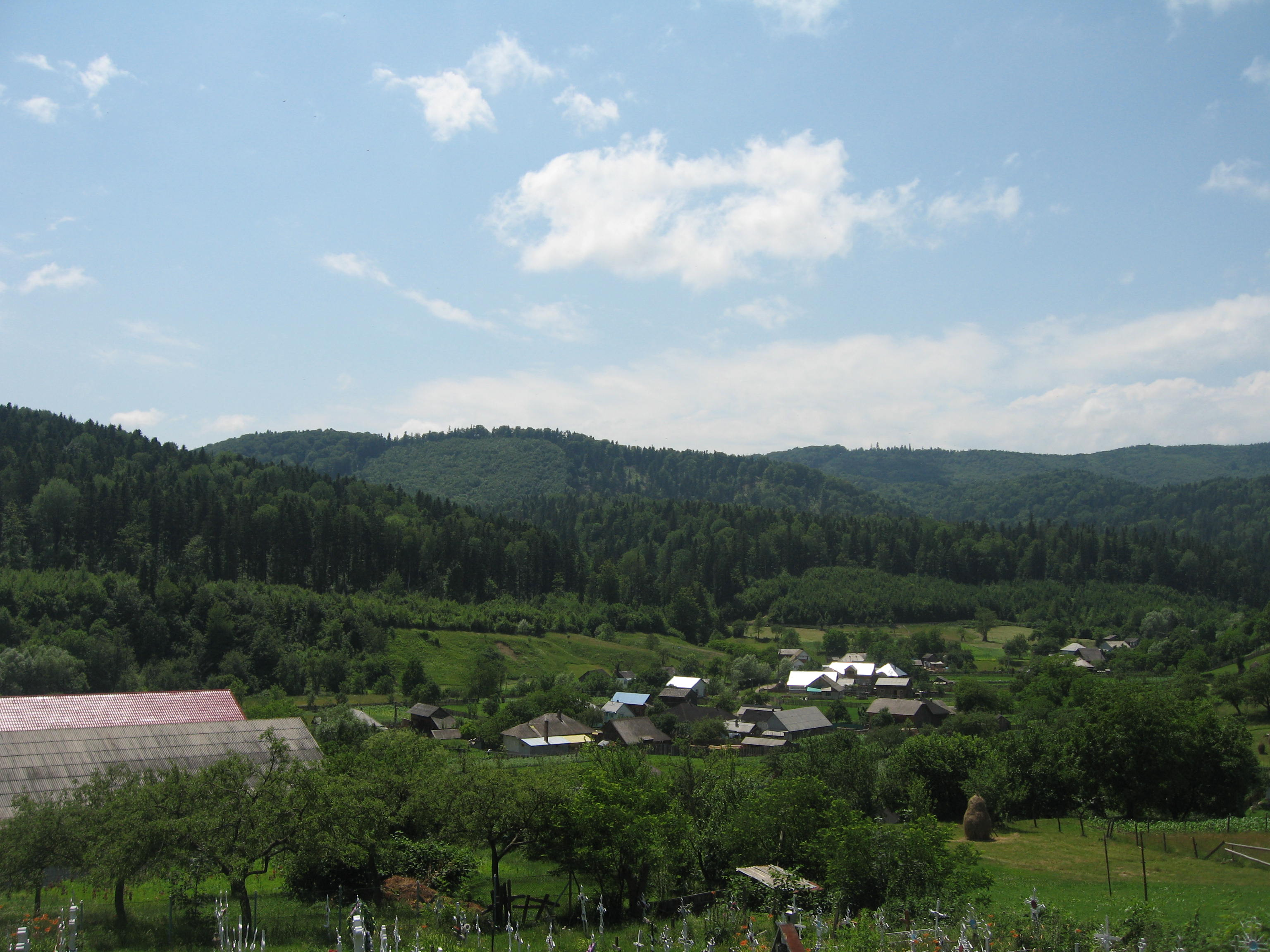
The Moldavian Subcarpathians viewed from Slătioara village, Suceava County

Moldavian Subcarpathians (Romanian: Subcarpații Moldovei) is a geographic area located in the northeast of Romania, to the east of the Eastern Carpathian Mountains. The Moldavian Subcarpathians are considered to be part of the Moldavian Plateau. They are composed of:

- Pleșului Ridge (Romanian: Culmea Pleșului)
- Neamț Depression (Romanian: Depresiunea Neamțului)
- Boiștea Hill (Romanian: Dealul Boiștea)
- Cornii Hills (Romanian: Dealurile Cornii)
- Cracău–Bistrița Depression (Romanian: Depresiunea Cracău–Bistrița)
- Runc Hills (Romanian: Dealul Runc)
- Bărboiu Hills (Romanian: Dealurile Bărboiu)
- Pietricica Ridge (Romanian: Culmea Pietricica)
- Tazlău–Cașin Depression (Romanian: Depresiunea Tazlău–Cașin)
- Oușuru Hills (Romanian: Dealurile Oușoru)
- Zabranț Hills (Romanian: Dealurile Zabranț)
- Răchitaș Hills (Romanian: Dealurile Răchitaș)

The Moldavian Subcarpathians are separated from the rest of the Moldavian Plateau by the Siret and Moldova River valleys (north and east), and are bounded by the Curvature Subcarpathians (Romanian: Subcarpații de Curbură) to the south. The highest point is Pleșului Ridge (northwest of Târgu Neamț), with an altitude of 911 metres (2,989 feet).

Moldavian Plateau
Topography
Bukovinian Subcarpathians; Moldavian Subcarpathians Suceava Plateau; Dniester Hills; Moldavian Plain; Bârlad Plateau; Central Moldavian Plateau Bălți Steppe; Bugeac Steppe
Hydrography
Danube; Siret (Moldova, Suceava); Prut; Dniester (Răut); Black Sea
Climate
Romania; Moldova
Flora & Fauna
Flora of Romania; Flora of Moldova; List of mammals in Romania; List of mammals in Moldova; Protected areas in Romania; Protected areas in Moldova
