= Bukovinian Subcarpathians =

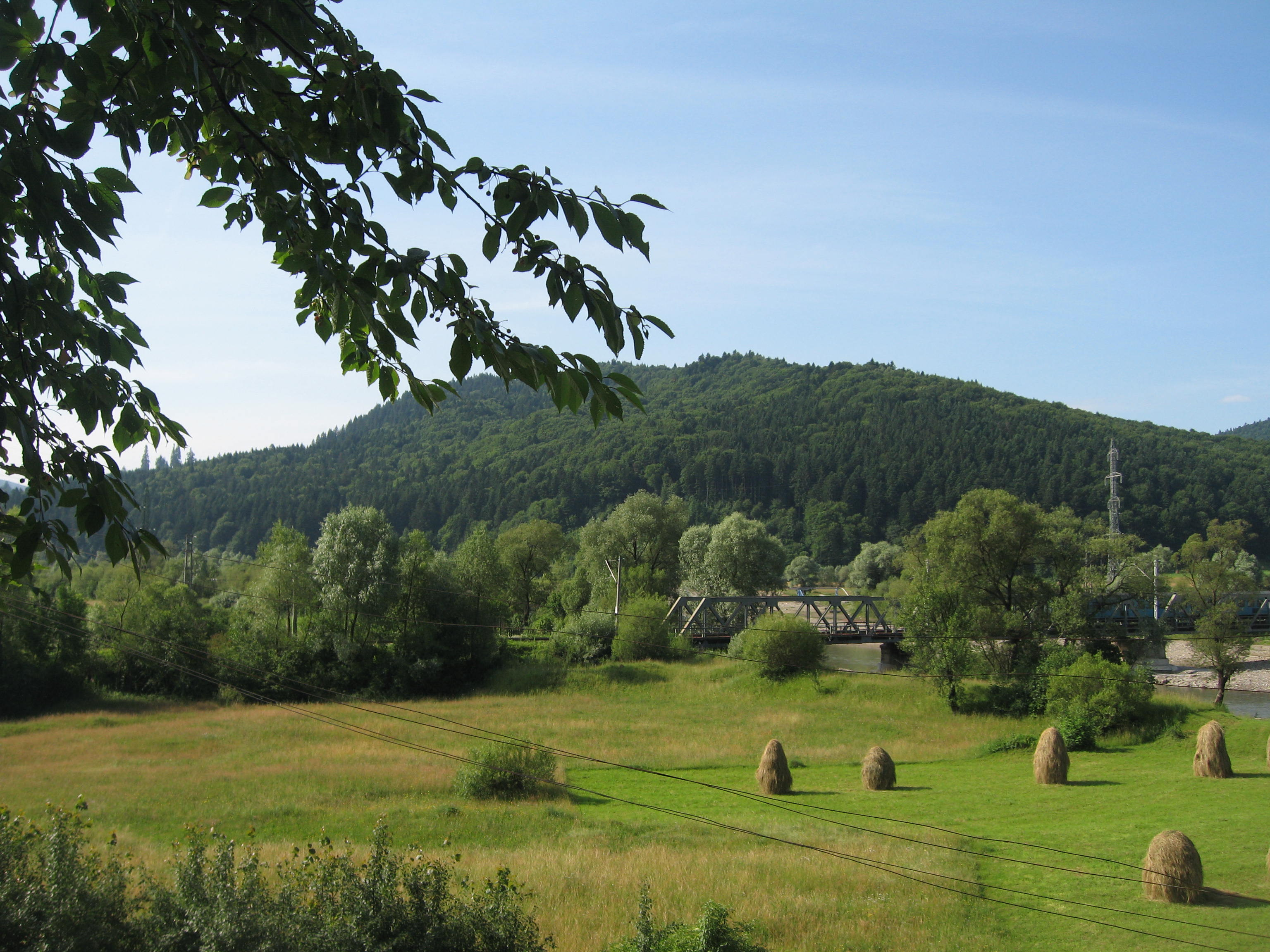
Great Ridge, crossed by the Moldova River

Bukovinian Subcarpathians (Romanian: Subcarpații Bucovinei, Obcinele Bucovinei) is a geographic area in the NNE of Romania (Suceava County) and SWW of Ukraine (Chernivtsi Oblast), situated to the east and north-east of the Eastern Carpathian Mountains. It is a subunit of the Eastern Carpathian Foothills.

The Bukovinian Subcarpathians are bounded by the Suceava Plateau on the low side, and the Eastern Carpathian Mountains on the upper side.

The area consists of:

- Brodina Ridge (Obcina Brodina). Highest peak: Poiana Săcălești, 1,316 m (4,318 ft).
- Curmătura Ridge (Obcina Curmătura). Highest peak: Chicera Neagră, 1,090 m (3,580 ft).
- Feredeu Ridge (Obcina Feredeu). Highest peak: Veju Mare, 1,494 m (4,902 ft).
- Humor Ridge (Obcina Humor)
- Great Ridge (Obcina Mare). Highest peaks: Sihloaia Peak, 1,224 m (4,016 ft) and Scorușețu Peak, 1,223 m (4,012 ft).
- Obcina Mestecăniș Mountains (Obcina Mestecăniș). Highest peak: Lucina Peak, 1,588 m (5,210 ft).
- Moldovița Ridge (Obcina Moldovița). Highest peak: Bobeica Peak, 1,207 m (3,960 ft).
- Șurdin Ridge (Obcina Șurdin). Highest peak: Lungul Peak, 1,382 m (4,534 ft).

Moldavian Plateau
Topography
Bukovinian Subcarpathians; Moldavian Subcarpathians Suceava Plateau; Dniester Hills; Moldavian Plain; Bârlad Plateau; Central Moldavian Plateau Bălți Steppe; Bugeac Steppe
Hydrography
Danube; Siret (Moldova, Suceava); Prut; Dniester (Răut); Black Sea
Climate
Romania; Moldova
Flora & Fauna
Flora of Romania; Flora of Moldova; List of mammals in Romania; List of mammals in Moldova; Protected areas in Romania; Protected areas in Moldova

== See also ==
- Outer Subcarpathia
- Divisions of the Carpathians
