= Suceava Plateau =

Geographic area in Romania and Ukraine

Moldavian Plateau
Topography
Bukovinian Subcarpathians; Moldavian Subcarpathians Suceava Plateau; Dniester Hills; Moldavian Plain; Bârlad Plateau; Central Moldavian Plateau Bălți Steppe; Bugeac Steppe
Hydrography
Danube; Siret (Moldova, Suceava); Prut; Dniester (Răut); Black Sea
Climate
Romania; Moldova
Flora & Fauna
Flora of Romania; Flora of Moldova; List of mammals in Romania; List of mammals in Moldova; Protected areas in Romania; Protected areas in Moldova

Suceava Plateau (Romanian: Podișul Sucevei) is a geographic area in northeastern Romania (parts of Suceava, Botoșani, Iași, and Neamț counties), and southwestern Ukraine (parts of Chernivtsi Oblast). The Suceava Plateau comprises the northwestern part of the Moldavian Plateau. It has altitudes that exceed 700 m (2,300 ft) and long ridges, such as:

- Fălticeni Plateau (Romanian: Podișul Fălticeni; also known as Ciungi Hills),
- Dragomirnei Plateau (Romanian: Podișul Dragomirnei; also known as Dragomirnei Hills),
- Siret Ridge (Romanian: Culmea Siretului); which itself contains Bour Hills, Șaua Bucecii/Bucecii Saddle, Dealul Mare/The Big Hill, and Șaua Ruginoasa/Ruginoasa Saddle,
- Ibănești Hills (Romanian: Dealurile Ibănești),
- Conzancea Hills (Romanian: Dealurile Cozancea),
- Prut Hills (Romanian: Deaurile Prutului) or Prut Ridge (Romanian: Culmea Prutului), which contain the famous Cosmin Forest (Romanian: Pădurea Cosminului)
- Ceremuș Hills (Romanian: Deaurile Ceremușului)

In the valley of the Suceava River, a hillock depression, the Rădăuți Depression (Romanian: Depresiunea Rădăuți) is situated. In the upper part of the valley of the Siret River, another hillock depression, the Storojineț Depression (Romanian: Depresiunea Storojineț) is situated.
