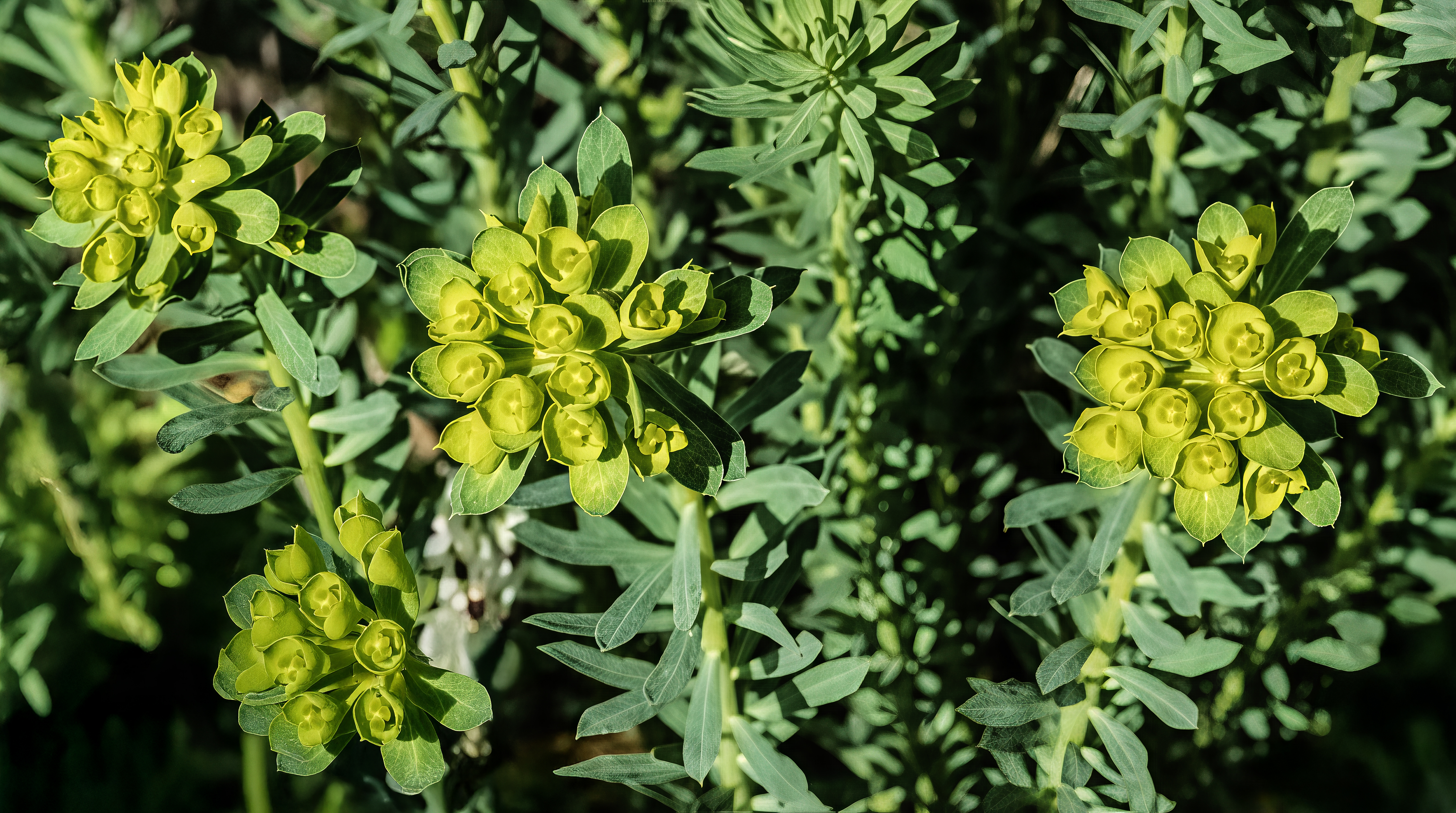

Scientific classification
- Kingdom: Plantae
- Clade: Tracheophytes
- Clade: Angiosperms
- Clade: Eudicots
- Clade: Rosids
- Order: Malpighiales
- Family: Euphorbiaceae
- Genus: Euphorbia
- Species: E. seguieriana

Binomial name
- Euphorbia seguieriana Neck.

= Euphorbia seguieriana =

Species of flowering plant

Euphorbia seguieriana is a species of flowering plant belonging to the family Euphorbiaceae.

Its native range is Europe to China and Pakistan.
