= Constantin Stamati-Ciurea =

Romanian writer and translator

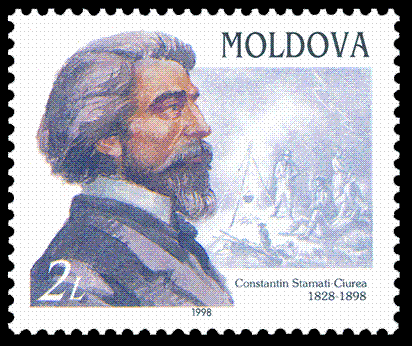

Constantin Stamati-Ciurea (4 May 1828 – 22 February 1898) was a Romanian writer and translator from Bessarabia. The son of Constantin Stamati, he followed in his father's footsteps as an author of prose, plays, and translations. He served as diplomat at Russia's embassies in Paris, Berlin, and London.

In 1895, the Romanian King Carol I awarded him the medal "bene merenti" for all his work. He published most of his writings first in Russian, because, as he confessed, there was no Romanian printing press in all Russia at that time. Toward his later years, he succeeded in publishing his works in Romanian in Cernauti (in Austria). He was one of the defenders of the Romanian identity of the native population of Bessarabia, as well as an outspoken voice against its exploitation.

== Quotations ==
"Deci, eu ca român mă uit cu oarecare invidie la aceşti venetici din lume, ce s-au îmbogăţit atunci, pe când ţăranul nostru stătea pe loc, în mare mizerie în comparaţie cu dânşii" (C. Stamati-Ciurea, Rasunet din Basarabia, p. 241 Editura Litera, 1998)
