= Răut =

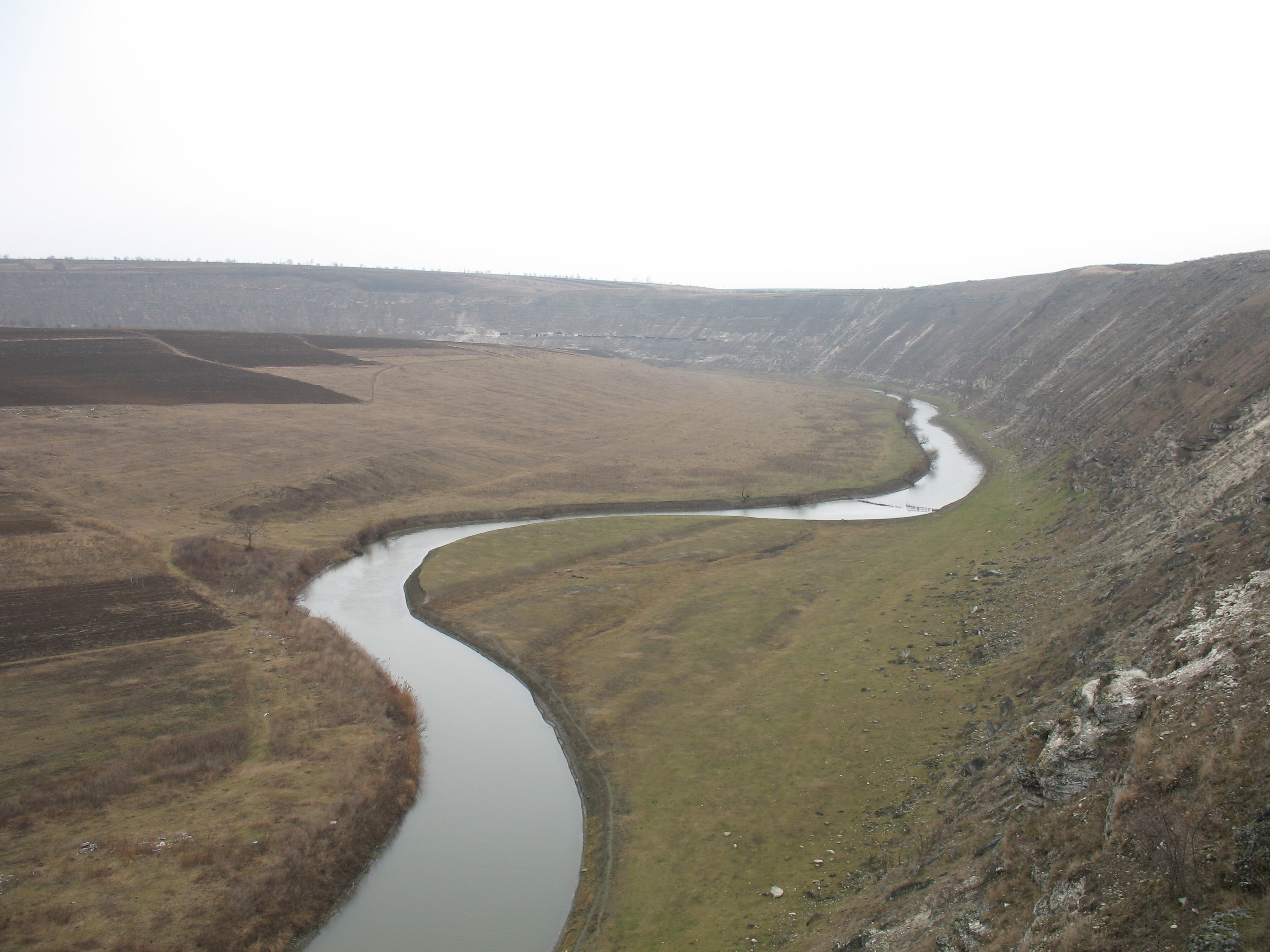
- Răut, Orhei District

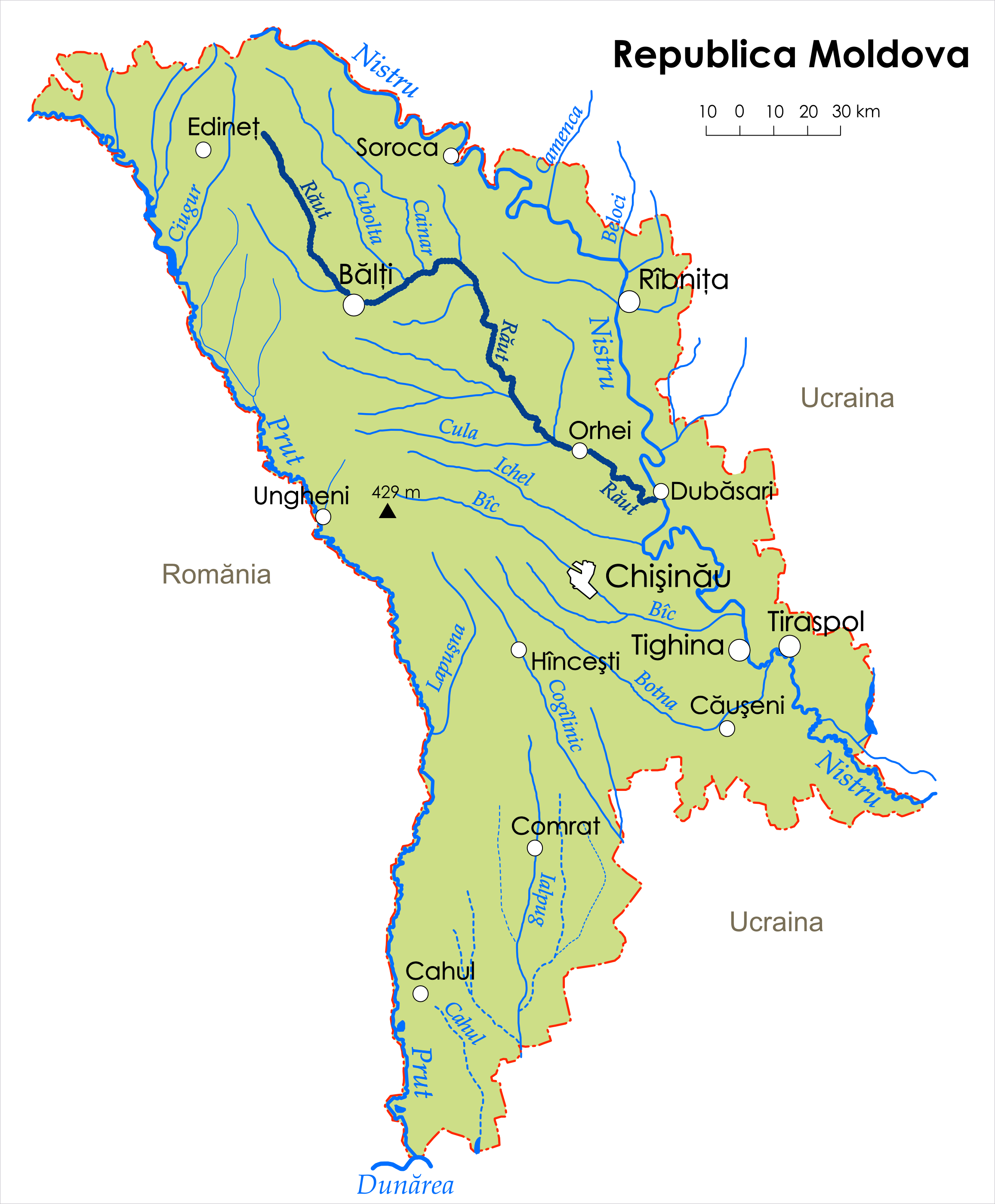
- Map of the Răut River (in Romanian)

Location
- Country: Moldova

Physical characteristics
- Mouth: Dniester
  - coordinates: 47.2445°N 29.1471°E
- Length: 286 km (178 mi)
- Basin size: 7,760 km^{2} (3,000 sq mi)

Basin features
- Progression: Dniester→ Dniester Estuary→ Black Sea

Răut, also referred to as Reut (Romanian: Răut, Ukrainian and Russian: Реут (Reut), Yiddish: רעװעט (Revet)) is a river in Moldova, a right tributary of Dniester. It is the longest river that is entirely in Moldova. Răut, generally navigable until the 18th-19th century, is navigable today only by small recreational boats.

The towns Bălți, Orhei, and Florești are located by the river.
