= Protected areas of Moldova =

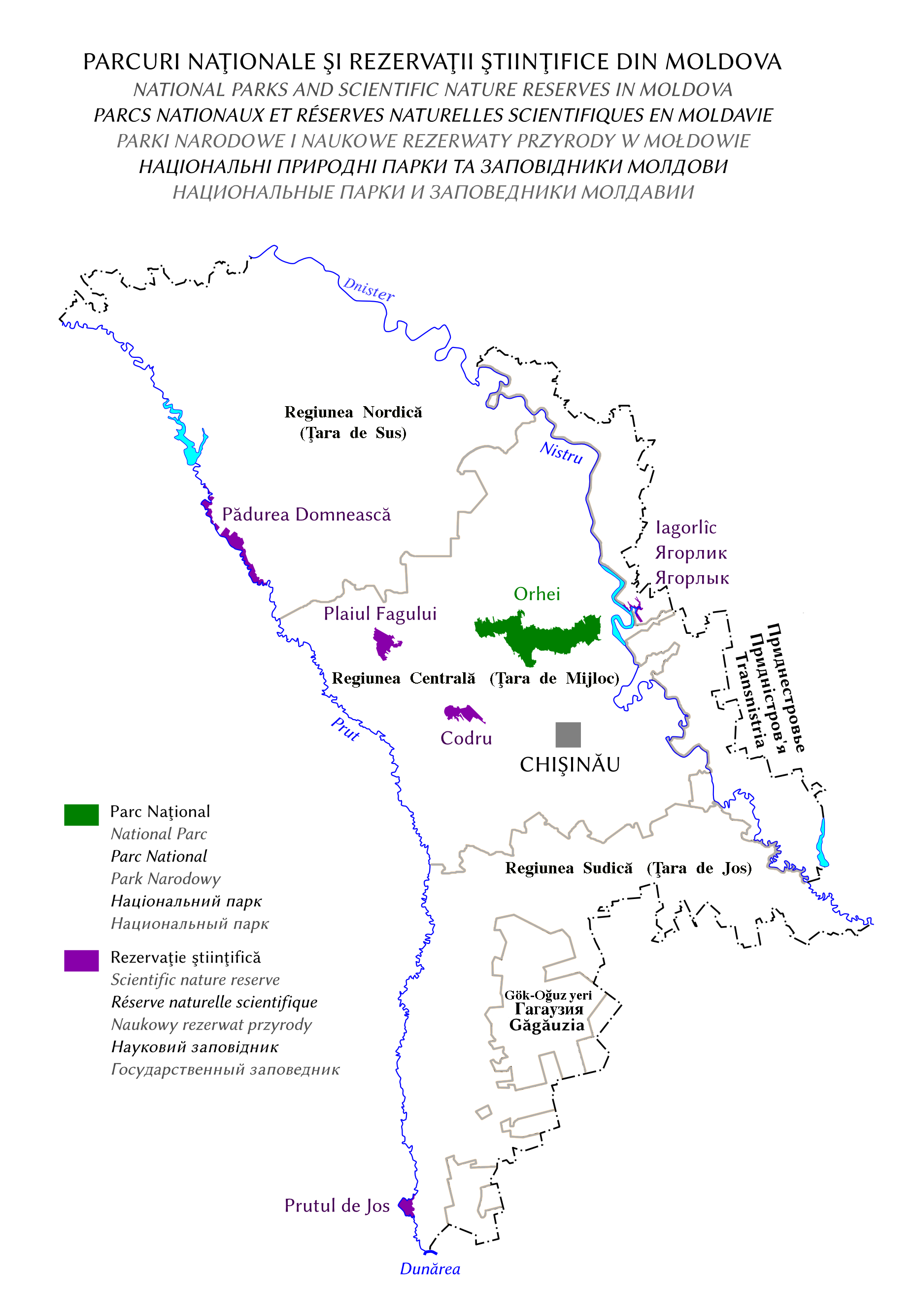
Scientific nature reserves and national parks of Moldova: National park Scientific reserves

Protected areas of Moldova include following categories:

- Scientific nature reserves (rom. rezervații științifice) – currently 5 reserves covering an area of 19379 ha. They are equivalent to IUCN category Ia (strict nature reserve).
- National parks – currently there’s one national park, created in 2013 Orhei National Park (rom. Parcul Național Orhei)
- Nature monuments (rom. monumente ale naturii)
- Nature reserves (rom. rezervații naturale)
- Landscape reserves (rom. rezervații peisagistice)
- Resource reserves (rom. rezervații de resurse)
- Areas with multifunctional management (rom. Arii cu management multifuncțional)
- Wetlands of international importance (rom. Zone umede de importanță internațională)
- Dendrological gardens (rom. grădini dendrologice)
- Landscape architecture monuments (rom. monumente de arhitectură peisajeră)
- Zoological garden in Chișinău (rom. Grădina Zoologică din Chișinău)

== National park ==
National park listed in UNESCO World Heritage
National park included in UNESCO's Man and the Biosphere Programme

Name		Location (district)	Coordinates	Area (ha)	Established	Year of declaration	Image	Website
1	Orhei National Park	Orhei; Strășeni; Călărași; Criuleni	47°18'N, 28°58'E	33,792.09 hectares (338 km^{2})	2008	2013		@ParculNationalOrhei

== Scientific nature reserves ==
Name		Location	Coordinates	Established	Area	Image
1	Codru Reserve	Strășeni	47°4'N, 28°30'E	1971	5,177 hectares (52 km^{2})	
2	Iagorlîc	Dubăsari	47°22'40.008"N, 29°9'45.000"E	1988	836 hectares (8 km^{2})	
3	Lower Prut	Cahul	45°42'N, 28°11'E	1991	1,691 hectares (17 km^{2})	
4	Plaiul Fagului	Ungheni	47°17'28"N, 28°3'16"E	1992	5,642 hectares (56 km^{2})	
5	Pădurea Domnească	Glodeni	47°36'35"N, 27°23'37"E	1993	6,032 hectares (60 km^{2})	

== Landscape reserves ==
Name		Location	Coordinates	Area	Image
1	Pădurea Hîrbovăț	Anenii Noi District	46°52'25.342"N, 29°23'24.616"E	2,218 hectare	
2	Telița	Anenii Noi District	46°58'12.785"N, 29°18'8.849"E	124 hectare	
3	Tețcani	Briceni District	48°10'5.653"N, 26°57'27.256"E	164 hectare	
4	Lopatnic	Briceni District	48°15'11.873"N, 27°1'39.634"E	452 hectare	
5	Bugornea	Camenca District	47°56'53.754"N, 28°50'22.337"E	606 hectare	
6	Valea Adîncă	Camenca District	48°0'49.918"N, 28°50'22.175"E	214 hectare	
7	Glubocaia Dolina	Camenca District	47°57'40.352"N, 28°53'10.572"E	520 hectare	
8	Lunca inundabilă de lângă Antonești	Cantemir District	46°19'50.351"N, 28°11'40.873"E	93.6 hectare	
9	Chioselia	Cantemir District	46°9'46.573"N, 28°22'38.050"E	307 hectare	
10	Codrii Tigheci	Cantemir District	46°19'27.476"N, 28°21'42.149"E	2,519 hectare	
11	Cărbuna	Căinari District	46°42'37.055"N, 28°53'48.235"E	607 hectare	
12	Țigănești	Călărași District	47°19'57.547"N, 28°30'25.999"E	680 hectare	
13	Voloca Verbca	Călărași District	47°12'12.456"N, 28°23'3.667"E	407 hectare	
14	Căbăiești -Pîrjolteni	Călărași District	47°11'46.874"N, 28°12'36.360"E	1,213 hectare	
15	Temeleuți	Călărași District	47°15'2.570"N, 28°6'23.530"E	209 hectare	
16	Râpele de la Cimișlia	Cimișlia District	46°31'6.539"N, 28°45'49.907"E	256 hectare	
17	Rudi – Arionești	Dondușeni District	48°20'55.370"N, 27°54'17.096"E	1,488 hectare	
18	Valea Seacă „Tamașlîc”	Dubăsari District	47°10'46.232"N, 29°20'56.688"E	394 hectare	
19	La Castel	Edineț District	48°8'39.732"N, 27°9'1.789"E	746 hectare	
20	Fetești	Edineț District	48°10'51.038"N, 27°7'11.017"E	555 hectare	
21	Zăbriceni	Edineț District	48°4'24.722"N, 27°14'11.209"E	596 hectare	
22	Izvoare – Risipeni	Fălești District	47°28'39.356"N, 27°36'59.173"E	1,162 hectare	
23	Pădurea din Hîncești	Hîncești District	46°50'42.407"N, 28°29'40.308"E	4,499 hectare	
24	Cazimir – Milești	Nisporeni District	47°13'27.91"N, 28°4'5.09"E	500 hectare	
25	Vila Nisporeni	Nisporeni District	47°0'34.492"N, 28°15'28.548"E	3,499 hectare	
26	Dolna	Nisporeni District	47°6'19.505"N, 28°15'59.584"E	389 hectare	
27	Calarașovca	Ocnița District	48°24'37.001"N, 27°49'42.272"E	52 hectare	
28	La 33 de Vaduri	Ocnița District	48°25'41.999"N, 27°34'16.226"E	184 hectare	
29	Pohrebeni	Orhei District	47°33'46.022"N, 28°53'14.554"E	1,049 hectare	
30	Trebujeni	Orhei District	47°19'36.124"N, 28°57'23.832"E	500 hectare	
31	Saharna	Rezina District	47°41'44.376"N, 28°57'49.957"E	674 hectare	
32	Țîpova	Rezina District	47°35'39.098"N, 28°58'17.746"E	306 hectare	
33	Suta de Movile	Rîșcani District	47°49'6.121"N, 27°18'7.409"E	1,072 hectare	
34	Grădina Turcească	Slobozia District	46°41'21.973"N, 29°36'46.084"E	224 hectare	
35	Cosăuți	Soroca District	48°12'4.900"N, 28°14'8.488"E	585 hectare	
36	Holoșnița	Soroca District	48°13'39.468"N, 28°5'44.930"E	199 hectare	
37	Căpriana – Scoreni	Strășeni District	47°5'16.728"N, 28°31'55.578"E	1,762.4 hectare	
38	Climăuții de Jos	Șoldănești District	47°58'4.681"N, 28°47'3.332"E	668 hectare	
39	Dobrușa	Șoldănești District	47°47'54.582"N, 28°38'45.301"E	2,634 hectare	
40	Poiana Curătura	Șoldănești District	47°53'3.19"N, 28°53'14.06"E	692 hectare	
41	Valea Mare	Ungheni District	47°7'15.589"N, 27°50'16.184"E	373 hectare	

== Monuments of landscape architecture ==
Name		Location	Coordinates	Area	Image
1	Parcul Hîrbovăț	Anenii Noi District	46°51'6.862"N, 29°23'37.914"E	2.2 hectare	
2	Parcul din satul Pavlovca	Briceni District	48°22'59.416"N, 26°52'37.747"E	18.3 hectare	
3	Aleea de tei dintre satele Pavlovca și Larga	Briceni District	48°22'30.533"N, 26°51'52.556"E	3 hectare	
4	Parcul din satul Cuhureștii de Sus	Florești District	47°55'12.7"N, 28°33'11.6"E	3 hectare	
5	Parcul din satul Temeleuți	Florești District	47°58'40.768"N, 28°29'40.412"E	3.8 hectare	
6	Alei de larice și tei, grupuri de conifere	Călărași District	47°12'32.976"N, 28°25'15.632"E	2 hectare	
7	Parcul din satul Bălăbănești	Criuleni District	47°3'37.033"N, 29°8'3.167"E	5 hectare	
8	Parcul din satul Miclești	Criuleni District	47°14'35.714"N, 28°48'12.560"E	2 hectare	
9	Parcul din satul Rediul Mare	Dondușeni District	48°13'42.118"N, 27°30'55.598"E	10 hectare	
10	Parcul din satul Țaul	Dondușeni District	48°12'19.206"N, 27°40'17.864"E	46 hectare	
11	Parcul din satul Mîndîc	Dondușeni District	48°9'40.003"N, 27°51'49.975"E	16.4 hectare	
12	Parcul „Iasnaia Poliana”	Drochia District	48°0'20.380"N, 27°48'26.741"E	12.8 hectare	
13	Parcul din satul Brînzeni	Edineț District	48°5'10.378"N, 27°10'51.370"E	2 hectare	
14	Parcul din satul Hincăuți	Edineț District	48°15'54.245"N, 27°20'51.745"E	27 hectare	
15	Parcul din satul Stolniceni	Edineț District	48°1'48.763"N, 27°20'20.630"E	3 hectare	
16	Parcul din satul Milești	Nisporeni District	47°12'49.691"N, 28°2'32.705"E	3 hectare	
17	Parcul din satul Ivancea	Orhei District	47°17'10.331"N, 28°51'29.275"E	3 hectare	
18	Parcul din satul Cubolta	Sîngerei District	47°52'35.926"N, 28°1'2.910"E	7 hectare	
19	Parcul „Leuntea”	Ștefan Vodă District	46°39'17.280"N, 29°35'10.043"E	21.49 hectare	
20	Grădina Muzeului Național de Etnografie și Istorie Naturală	Chișinău	47°1'24.820"N, 28°49'12.943"E	0.075 hectare	
21	Parcul de cultură și odihnă „Valea Morilor”	Chișinău	47°1'16.766"N, 28°48'54.630"E	113.9 hectare	

== See also ==
- Protected areas of Romania
- Protected areas of Ukraine
