= Climate of Romania =

Geography of Romania
Topography

Carpathians (peaks)
Plains & Delta
Islands

Hydrography

Rivers (Danube)
Lakes
Black Sea

Climate

The climate of Romania is continental, transitioning into humid subtropical (locally often "warm oceanic" or "Pontic") on the eastern coast, influenced by polar intrusions, and therefore characterized by harsh winters. The mountain ranges of the Carpathian arc have a cool mountain climate with high humidity throughout the year.

Rainfall, although adequate throughout the country, decreases from west to east and from mountains to plains. Some mountainous areas receive more than 1,010 mm (39.8 in) of precipitation each year. Annual precipitation averages about 635 mm (25 in) in central Transylvania, 521 mm (20.5 in) at Iași in Moldavia, and only 240 mm (9 in) at Sulina on the Black Sea.

Romania map of Köppen climate classification

Summers in the country are generally very warm to hot, and temperatures over 36 °C (97 °F) are not unknown in the lower-lying areas of the country. Night time lows in Bucharest and other lower-lying areas are around 16 °C (60.8 °F), and in Sulina they are around 21 °C (69.8 °F), but at higher altitudes both maxima and minima decline considerably.

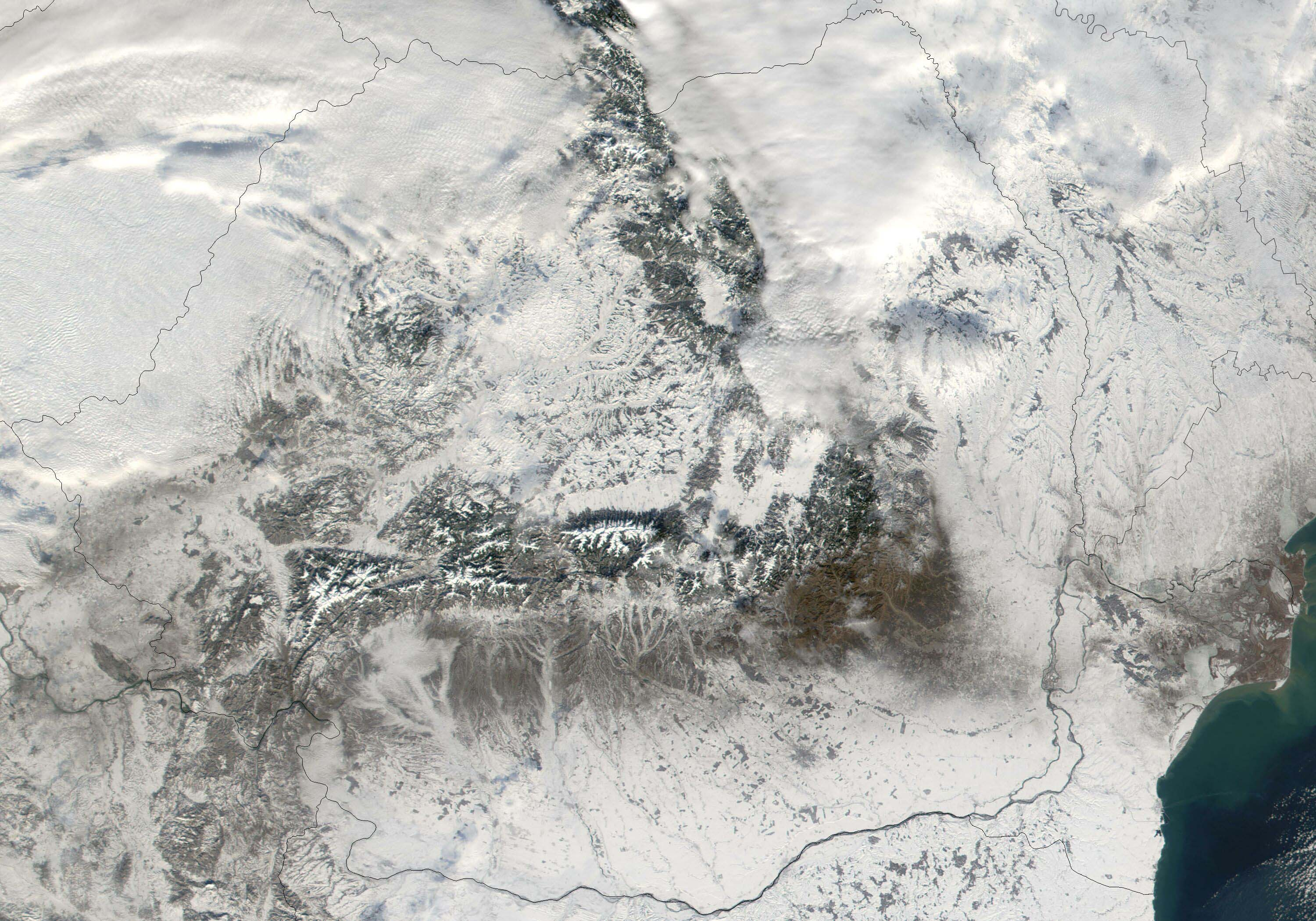
Satellite image of Romania in December 2001, showing most of its territory under snow

In the coldest months of winter (December and January) temperatures average between 1 °C (33.8 °F) and −10 °C (14.0 °F). During winter, the skies are often cloudy and snowfall is quite common. In the plains of Romania there are about thirty days with snowfall per year.

== Records ==
The absolute minimum temperature is −38.5 °C (−37.3 °F), registered in Bod, Brașov County on 25 January 1942. The absolute maximum temperature is 44.5 °C (112.1 °F), recorded at Ion Sion (nowadays Râmnicelu), Brăila County on 10 August 1951. The warmest overnight temperature ever recorded is 29.8 °C (85.6 °F) at Oravița, Caraș-Severin County on 17 July 2024.

Climate data for Romania
Month	Jan	Feb	Mar	Apr	May	Jun	Jul	Aug	Sep	Oct	Nov	Dec	Year
Record high °C (°F)	22.2 (72.0)	26.0 (78.8)	32.8 (91.0)	35.5 (95.9)	40.8 (105.4)	42.0 (107.6)	44.3 (111.7)	44.5 (112.1)	43.5 (110.3)	39.0 (102.2)	30.5 (86.9)	23.4 (74.1)	44.5 (112.1)
Record low °C (°F)	−38.5 (−37.3)	−38.0 (−36.4)	−31.4 (−24.5)	−26 (−15)	−16 (3)	−12 (10)	−8.0 (17.6)	−7.0 (19.4)	−15 (5)	−21.3 (−6.3)	−30.8 (−23.4)	−34.5 (−30.1)	−38.5 (−37.3)
Source: National Meteorological Administration

== Averages and records ==
=== Cities ===
Climate data for Bucharest (1981–2010, extremes 1929–present)
Month	Jan	Feb	Mar	Apr	May	Jun	Jul	Aug	Sep	Oct	Nov	Dec	Year
Record high °C (°F)	23.6 (74.5)	26.5 (79.7)	32.8 (91.0)	34.9 (94.8)	36.9 (98.4)	41.6 (106.9)	45.4 (113.7)	43.9 (111.0)	39.9 (103.8)	36.4 (97.5)	29.4 (84.9)	20.9 (69.6)	45.4 (113.7)
Mean daily maximum °C (°F)	2.8 (37.0)	5.5 (41.9)	11.4 (52.5)	18.0 (64.4)	24.0 (75.2)	27.7 (81.9)	29.8 (85.6)	29.8 (85.6)	24.6 (76.3)	17.9 (64.2)	9.8 (49.6)	3.8 (38.8)	17.1 (62.8)
Daily mean °C (°F)	−1.3 (29.7)	0.4 (32.7)	5.4 (41.7)	11.2 (52.2)	16.8 (62.2)	20.6 (69.1)	22.5 (72.5)	22.0 (71.6)	16.9 (62.4)	11.0 (51.8)	4.7 (40.5)	0.2 (32.4)	10.8 (51.4)
Mean daily minimum °C (°F)	−4.8 (23.4)	−4.0 (24.8)	0.1 (32.2)	4.9 (40.8)	9.6 (49.3)	13.6 (56.5)	15.4 (59.7)	14.9 (58.8)	10.5 (50.9)	5.4 (41.7)	0.6 (33.1)	−3.4 (25.9)	5.2 (41.4)
Record low °C (°F)	−32.2 (−26.0)	−29.0 (−20.2)	−21.7 (−7.1)	−9.5 (14.9)	−1.1 (30.0)	4.5 (40.1)	7.4 (45.3)	5.2 (41.4)	−3.1 (26.4)	−8.0 (17.6)	−19.4 (−2.9)	−25.6 (−14.1)	−32.2 (−26.0)
Average precipitation mm (inches)	37 (1.5)	37 (1.5)	44 (1.7)	50 (2.0)	56 (2.2)	83 (3.3)	70 (2.8)	56 (2.2)	64 (2.5)	53 (2.1)	46 (1.8)	48 (1.9)	643 (25.3)
Average snowfall cm (inches)	13.7 (5.4)	11.0 (4.3)	10.5 (4.1)	1.5 (0.6)	0.0 (0.0)	0.0 (0.0)	0.0 (0.0)	0.0 (0.0)	0.0 (0.0)	0.0 (0.0)	8.8 (3.5)	10.5 (4.1)	56.0 (22.0)
Average rainy days	6	6	9	11	12	11	9	8	8	10	10	9	109
Average snowy days	8	7	5	1	0.03	0	0	0	0	0.3	3	7	31
Average relative humidity (%)	89	83	75	71	69	70	68	68	73	79	85	88	76
Mean monthly sunshine hours	70.6	84.5	138.0	184.8	246.3	265.8	289.2	281.4	224.1	177.4	87.5	62.8	2,112.4
Average ultraviolet index	1	2	3	5	7	8	8	7	5	3	2	1	4
Source 1: Pogoda.ru.net (average temperatures, humidity, precipitation, and snowy days)
Source 2: NOAA (snowfall and sunshine, 1961–1990), Administrația Națională de Meteorologie (extremes) and Weather Atlas

Climate data for Cluj-Napoca (1981–2010 normals, extremes 1901–2000)
Month	Jan	Feb	Mar	Apr	May	Jun	Jul	Aug	Sep	Oct	Nov	Dec	Year
Record high °C (°F)	15.4 (59.7)	19.6 (67.3)	26.7 (80.1)	31.2 (88.2)	32.5 (90.5)	36.0 (96.8)	38.0 (100.4)	38.5 (101.3)	34.4 (93.9)	32.6 (90.7)	26.0 (78.8)	18.7 (65.7)	38.5 (101.3)
Mean daily maximum °C (°F)	0.5 (32.9)	3.0 (37.4)	9.5 (49.1)	15.8 (60.4)	21.2 (70.2)	23.8 (74.8)	25.9 (78.6)	25.8 (78.4)	20.9 (69.6)	15.2 (59.4)	7.4 (45.3)	1.6 (34.9)	14.2 (57.6)
Daily mean °C (°F)	−2.6 (27.3)	−0.9 (30.4)	4.5 (40.1)	10.1 (50.2)	15.1 (59.2)	17.9 (64.2)	19.8 (67.6)	19.5 (67.1)	15.0 (59.0)	9.8 (49.6)	3.5 (38.3)	−1.3 (29.7)	9.2 (48.6)
Mean daily minimum °C (°F)	−5.7 (21.7)	−4.8 (23.4)	−0.6 (30.9)	4.3 (39.7)	8.9 (48.0)	12.0 (53.6)	13.7 (56.7)	13.2 (55.8)	9.2 (48.6)	4.4 (39.9)	−0.3 (31.5)	−4.2 (24.4)	4.2 (39.6)
Record low °C (°F)	−34.2 (−29.6)	−32.5 (−26.5)	−22.0 (−7.6)	−8.4 (16.9)	−3.5 (25.7)	0.4 (32.7)	5.2 (41.4)	3.5 (38.3)	−3.0 (26.6)	−8.8 (16.2)	−22.3 (−8.1)	−27.9 (−18.2)	−34.2 (−29.6)
Average precipitation mm (inches)	25.7 (1.01)	24.5 (0.96)	31.0 (1.22)	50.9 (2.00)	66.9 (2.63)	90.5 (3.56)	85.7 (3.37)	65.9 (2.59)	48.5 (1.91)	37.2 (1.46)	32.1 (1.26)	35.5 (1.40)	594.4 (23.40)
Average snowfall cm (inches)	6.0 (2.4)	11.5 (4.5)	5.8 (2.3)	1.3 (0.5)	0.0 (0.0)	0.0 (0.0)	0.0 (0.0)	0.0 (0.0)	0.0 (0.0)	0.5 (0.2)	2.6 (1.0)	5.8 (2.3)	33.5 (13.2)
Average precipitation days (≥ 0.1 mm)	12.9	12.7	11.2	13.3	14.7	14.9	13.2	11.3	11.1	10.0	12.2	14.0	151.5
Average relative humidity (%)	87	82	74	72	74	77	76	76	78	81	86	88	79
Mean monthly sunshine hours	66	99	157	185	241	253	276	263	193	159	88	52	2,030
Source 1: World Meteorological Organization,
Source 2: Romanian National Statistic Institute NOAA (snowfall 1961–1990), Deutscher Wetterdienst (humidity, 1973–1993)

Climate data for Timișoara (1961–1990)
Month	Jan	Feb	Mar	Apr	May	Jun	Jul	Aug	Sep	Oct	Nov	Dec	Year
Record high °C (°F)	17.4 (63.3)	20.5 (68.9)	28.2 (82.8)	32.0 (89.6)	34.5 (94.1)	38.4 (101.1)	39.6 (103.3)	41.0 (105.8)	39.7 (103.5)	33.8 (92.8)	27.1 (80.8)	22.2 (72.0)	41.0 (105.8)
Mean daily maximum °C (°F)	2.3 (36.1)	5.6 (42.1)	11.9 (53.4)	19.6 (67.3)	24.8 (76.6)	27.7 (81.9)	29.8 (85.6)	29.6 (85.3)	24.0 (75.2)	19.1 (66.4)	10.3 (50.5)	4.2 (39.6)	16.5 (61.7)
Daily mean °C (°F)	−1.6 (29.1)	1.2 (34.2)	5.8 (42.4)	11.2 (52.2)	16.3 (61.3)	19.4 (66.9)	21.1 (70.0)	20.4 (68.7)	16.5 (61.7)	11.0 (51.8)	5.6 (42.1)	0.8 (33.4)	10.6 (51.1)
Mean daily minimum °C (°F)	−4.8 (23.4)	−2.3 (27.9)	1.2 (34.2)	5.8 (42.4)	10.1 (50.2)	13.4 (56.1)	14.6 (58.3)	14.3 (57.7)	11.2 (52.2)	6.2 (43.2)	2.1 (35.8)	−1.7 (28.9)	5.8 (42.4)
Record low °C (°F)	−35.3 (−31.5)	−29.2 (−20.6)	−20.0 (−4.0)	−5.2 (22.6)	−5.0 (23.0)	2.2 (36.0)	5.9 (42.6)	5.0 (41.0)	−1.9 (28.6)	−6.8 (19.8)	−15.4 (4.3)	−24.8 (−12.6)	−35.3 (−31.5)
Average precipitation mm (inches)	40 (1.6)	36 (1.4)	37 (1.5)	48 (1.9)	65 (2.6)	76 (3.0)	64 (2.5)	50 (2.0)	40 (1.6)	39 (1.5)	48 (1.9)	50 (2.0)	593 (23.3)
Average snowfall cm (inches)	9.8 (3.9)	9.3 (3.7)	4.4 (1.7)	0.0 (0.0)	0.0 (0.0)	0.0 (0.0)	0.0 (0.0)	0.0 (0.0)	0.0 (0.0)	0.0 (0.0)	3.7 (1.5)	7.2 (2.8)	34.4 (13.5)
Average precipitation days (≥ 1.0 mm)	7	7	7	8	9	10	7	6	6	5	8	9	89
Average relative humidity (%)	90	86	79	73	73	74	73	75	76	81	85	89	80
Mean monthly sunshine hours	72.1	92.2	155.4	186.4	242.4	262.3	300.6	280.2	217.5	177.3	86.4	56.9	2,129.7
Source 1: NOAA, Deutscher Wetterdienst
Source 2: National Institute of Statistics (extremes, 1901–2000)

Climate data for Iași, Romania (1981–2010)
Month	Jan	Feb	Mar	Apr	May	Jun	Jul	Aug	Sep	Oct	Nov	Dec	Year
Record high °C (°F)	16.7 (62.1)	22.5 (72.5)	27.0 (80.6)	31.8 (89.2)	36.4 (97.5)	38.0 (100.4)	40.1 (104.2)	39.7 (103.5)	38.0 (100.4)	33.9 (93.0)	29.0 (84.2)	19.5 (67.1)	40.1 (104.2)
Mean daily maximum °C (°F)	1.1 (34.0)	3.3 (37.9)	11.3 (52.3)	18.7 (65.7)	24.1 (75.4)	30.1 (86.2)	30.1 (86.2)	30.8 (87.4)	25.4 (77.7)	16.1 (61.0)	11.1 (52.0)	2.3 (36.1)	15.4 (59.7)
Daily mean °C (°F)	−2.3 (27.9)	−0.9 (30.4)	3.9 (39.0)	10.5 (50.9)	16.7 (62.1)	19.9 (67.8)	21.7 (71.1)	20.9 (69.6)	15.9 (60.6)	10.2 (50.4)	4.0 (39.2)	−0.9 (30.4)	10.0 (50.0)
Mean daily minimum °C (°F)	−5.2 (22.6)	−4.2 (24.4)	−0.1 (31.8)	5.4 (41.7)	10.6 (51.1)	14.2 (57.6)	15.9 (60.6)	15.2 (59.4)	10.8 (51.4)	5.9 (42.6)	0.9 (33.6)	−3.7 (25.3)	5.5 (41.9)
Record low °C (°F)	−30.6 (−23.1)	−36.3 (−33.3)	−22.7 (−8.9)	−9.4 (15.1)	−3.0 (26.6)	3.5 (38.3)	6.3 (43.3)	4.6 (40.3)	−3.5 (25.7)	−9.6 (14.7)	−21.1 (−6.0)	−29.5 (−21.1)	−36.3 (−33.3)
Average precipitation mm (inches)	27.9 (1.10)	25.9 (1.02)	30.8 (1.21)	46.1 (1.81)	55.2 (2.17)	88.2 (3.47)	74.9 (2.95)	54.9 (2.16)	54.9 (2.16)	37.0 (1.46)	34.3 (1.35)	31.6 (1.24)	561.7 (22.11)
Average snowfall cm (inches)	11.3 (4.4)	14.3 (5.6)	11.9 (4.7)	6.9 (2.7)	0.0 (0.0)	0.0 (0.0)	0.0 (0.0)	0.0 (0.0)	0.0 (0.0)	0.7 (0.3)	10.4 (4.1)	6.3 (2.5)	61.8 (24.3)
Average precipitation days (≥ 0.1 mm)	12.6	11.2	11.6	11.4	12.1	12.3	11.0	8.5	8.7	8.1	10.1	12.6	130.2
Average relative humidity (%)	82	80	71	62	61	62	60	63	66	73	79	83	70
Mean monthly sunshine hours	67	91	136	180	256	260	288	275	200	153	79	61	2,046
Source 1: World Meteorological Organization, Ogimet (mean temperatures and sun 1981–2010)
Source 2: Romanian National Statistic Institute (extremes 1901–2000), NOAA (sunshine and snowfall 1961–1990), Deutscher Wetterdienst (extremes, 1896–2015 and humidity, 1896–1960)

Climate data for Constanța (1981–2010)
Month	Jan	Feb	Mar	Apr	May	Jun	Jul	Aug	Sep	Oct	Nov	Dec	Year
Record high °C (°F)	18.3 (64.9)	24.5 (76.1)	30.8 (87.4)	31.9 (89.4)	36.9 (98.4)	36.9 (98.4)	38.5 (101.3)	36.8 (98.2)	34.8 (94.6)	32.0 (89.6)	26.5 (79.7)	21.0 (69.8)	38.5 (101.3)
Mean daily maximum °C (°F)	4.5 (40.1)	5.7 (42.3)	9.3 (48.7)	17.1 (62.8)	24.0 (75.2)	28.7 (83.7)	29.2 (84.6)	29.1 (84.4)	25.7 (78.3)	21.4 (70.5)	13.3 (55.9)	6.2 (43.2)	15.9 (60.6)
Daily mean °C (°F)	1.3 (34.3)	2.0 (35.6)	5.5 (41.9)	10.3 (50.5)	16.1 (61.0)	20.7 (69.3)	23.2 (73.8)	23.0 (73.4)	18.6 (65.5)	13.5 (56.3)	7.7 (45.9)	3.0 (37.4)	12.1 (53.8)
Mean daily minimum °C (°F)	−1.4 (29.5)	−0.7 (30.7)	2.7 (36.9)	7.3 (45.1)	12.5 (54.5)	16.9 (62.4)	19.1 (66.4)	19.0 (66.2)	14.9 (58.8)	10.3 (50.5)	4.9 (40.8)	0.3 (32.5)	8.8 (47.8)
Record low °C (°F)	−24.7 (−12.5)	−25.0 (−13.0)	−12.8 (9.0)	−4.5 (23.9)	1.8 (35.2)	6.4 (43.5)	7.6 (45.7)	8.0 (46.4)	1.0 (33.8)	−12.4 (9.7)	−11.7 (10.9)	−18.6 (−1.5)	−25.0 (−13.0)
Average precipitation mm (inches)	27.6 (1.09)	24.0 (0.94)	34.0 (1.34)	31.8 (1.25)	37.9 (1.49)	40.4 (1.59)	37.5 (1.48)	35.2 (1.39)	42.1 (1.66)	36.8 (1.45)	45.6 (1.80)	37.0 (1.46)	429.9 (16.93)
Average snowfall cm (inches)	7.0 (2.8)	7.0 (2.8)	4.2 (1.7)	0.0 (0.0)	0.0 (0.0)	0.0 (0.0)	0.0 (0.0)	0.0 (0.0)	0.0 (0.0)	0.0 (0.0)	5.5 (2.2)	3.4 (1.3)	27.1 (10.7)
Average precipitation days (≥ 0.1 mm)	9.9	8.5	9.2	8.2	9.1	8.2	7.0	4.6	6.1	7.1	9.0	10.5	97.4
Average relative humidity (%)	86	85	85	83	81	78	76	77	79	82	86	88	82
Mean monthly sunshine hours	87	110	140	192	272	282	327	308	230	168	102	83	2,301
Source 1: World Meteorological Organization, Ogimet (mean temperatures and sun 1981–2010)
Source 2: Romanian National Statistic Institute (extremes 1901–2000), NOAA (snowfall 1961–1990), Deutscher Wetterdienst (humidity, 1973–1993)

Climate data for Sulina (1991−2020 normals, extremes 1961−2020)
Month	Jan	Feb	Mar	Apr	May	Jun	Jul	Aug	Sep	Oct	Nov	Dec	Year
Record high °C (°F)	13.8 (56.8)	17.9 (64.2)	24.5 (76.1)	23.2 (73.8)	29.3 (84.7)	33.8 (92.8)	34.5 (94.1)	34.4 (93.9)	32.6 (90.7)	26.2 (79.2)	22.2 (72.0)	16.6 (61.9)	34.5 (94.1)
Mean daily maximum °C (°F)	3.5 (38.3)	4.3 (39.7)	7.7 (45.9)	12.8 (55.0)	19.1 (66.4)	24.1 (75.4)	26.7 (80.1)	26.5 (79.7)	21.7 (71.1)	16.1 (61.0)	10.5 (50.9)	5.6 (42.1)	14.9 (58.8)
Daily mean °C (°F)	0.9 (33.6)	1.8 (35.2)	5.1 (41.2)	10.4 (50.7)	16.5 (61.7)	21.2 (70.2)	23.6 (74.5)	23.5 (74.3)	18.9 (66.0)	13.6 (56.5)	8.2 (46.8)	3.1 (37.6)	12.2 (54.0)
Mean daily minimum °C (°F)	−1.3 (29.7)	−0.3 (31.5)	3.3 (37.9)	8.6 (47.5)	14.5 (58.1)	18.8 (65.8)	20.9 (69.6)	20.9 (69.6)	16.4 (61.5)	11.5 (52.7)	6.0 (42.8)	0.9 (33.6)	10.0 (50.0)
Record low °C (°F)	−17.7 (0.1)	−17.8 (0.0)	−15.6 (3.9)	−0.7 (30.7)	4.4 (39.9)	9.3 (48.7)	12.1 (53.8)	10.5 (50.9)	4.4 (39.9)	−1.0 (30.2)	−8.0 (17.6)	−11.5 (11.3)	−17.8 (0.0)
Average precipitation mm (inches)	16.0 (0.63)	11.9 (0.47)	17.4 (0.69)	14.0 (0.55)	20.3 (0.80)	28.3 (1.11)	18.9 (0.74)	23.5 (0.93)	21.5 (0.85)	24.3 (0.96)	22.7 (0.89)	21.7 (0.85)	240.5 (9.47)
Average precipitation days (≥ 1.0 mm)	3.6	3.3	4.0	3.8	4.0	3.7	2.7	2.3	3.2	3.5	3.8	4.7	42.6
Average relative humidity (%)	84	82	80	77	76	73	72	74	76	79	83	84	78
Average dew point °C (°F)	−1.6 (29.1)	−1.2 (29.8)	1.7 (35.1)	7.0 (44.6)	12.3 (54.1)	16.2 (61.2)	18.0 (64.4)	17.8 (64.0)	14.7 (58.5)	10.0 (50.0)	5.3 (41.5)	1.4 (34.5)	8.5 (47.2)
Mean monthly sunshine hours	75.9	103.1	148.3	204.2	278.9	305.1	334.7	308.5	229.7	159.8	90.0	73.4	2,311.6
Source 1: NOAA (dew point 1961–1990)
Source 2: Danish Meteorological Institute (humidity, 1931–1960)

=== Other locations ===
Climate data for Vârfu Omu (1991–2020 normals, extremes 1961–2020) (Note: Snowfall and Dew point data are for the 1961-1990 period.), Elevation: 2,504 45°26′45″N 25°27′24″E
Month	Jan	Feb	Mar	Apr	May	Jun	Jul	Aug	Sep	Oct	Nov	Dec	Year
Record high °C (°F)	4.5 (40.1)	5.9 (42.6)	12.2 (54.0)	12.8 (55.0)	16.6 (61.9)	18.1 (64.6)	22.1 (71.8)	19.5 (67.1)	19.2 (66.6)	16.0 (60.8)	12.6 (54.7)	8.2 (46.8)	22.1 (71.8)
Mean daily maximum °C (°F)	−7.2 (19.0)	−7.2 (19.0)	−5.0 (23.0)	−0.9 (30.4)	3.6 (38.5)	7.6 (45.7)	9.8 (49.6)	10.3 (50.5)	6.0 (42.8)	2.7 (36.9)	−1.3 (29.7)	−5.6 (21.9)	1.1 (33.9)
Daily mean °C (°F)	−9.9 (14.2)	−10.0 (14.0)	−8.1 (17.4)	−3.8 (25.2)	1.0 (33.8)	4.8 (40.6)	6.8 (44.2)	7.2 (45.0)	3.1 (37.6)	−0.1 (31.8)	−4.0 (24.8)	−8.2 (17.2)	−1.8 (28.8)
Mean daily minimum °C (°F)	−12.5 (9.5)	−12.6 (9.3)	−10.7 (12.7)	−6.2 (20.8)	−1.2 (29.8)	2.5 (36.5)	4.3 (39.7)	4.8 (40.6)	0.9 (33.6)	−2.6 (27.3)	−6.5 (20.3)	−10.7 (12.7)	−4.2 (24.4)
Record low °C (°F)	−32.3 (−26.1)	−35.5 (−31.9)	−29.6 (−21.3)	−19.4 (−2.9)	−14.0 (6.8)	−9.6 (14.7)	−7.4 (18.7)	−11.0 (12.2)	−17.6 (0.3)	−20.8 (−5.4)	−26.5 (−15.7)	−29.2 (−20.6)	−35.5 (−31.9)
Average precipitation mm (inches)	51.2 (2.02)	50.5 (1.99)	63.9 (2.52)	64.6 (2.54)	98.2 (3.87)	139.9 (5.51)	140.0 (5.51)	105.5 (4.15)	70.5 (2.78)	60.3 (2.37)	49.0 (1.93)	56.5 (2.22)	950.1 (37.41)
Average snowfall cm (inches)	50.6 (19.9)	62.4 (24.6)	71.8 (28.3)	85.1 (33.5)	85.3 (33.6)	46.2 (18.2)	7.3 (2.9)	4.8 (1.9)	12.4 (4.9)	16.3 (6.4)	20.8 (8.2)	37.6 (14.8)	500.6 (197.2)
Average precipitation days (≥ 1.0 mm)	10.2	10.8	12.5	13.3	16.2	14.9	14.3	10.7	9.1	8.4	8.7	10.2	139.3
Average dew point °C (°F)	−13.4 (7.9)	−12.8 (9.0)	−10.2 (13.6)	−5.6 (21.9)	−1.0 (30.2)	1.7 (35.1)	3.7 (38.7)	3.1 (37.6)	0.1 (32.2)	−4.3 (24.3)	−8.1 (17.4)	−10.9 (12.4)	−4.8 (23.4)
Mean monthly sunshine hours	108.9	106.2	119.8	123.9	142.8	144.7	176.4	181.3	142.2	156.5	118.6	104.7	1,626
Source: NOAA NCEI

== See also ==
- Climate
