= Glossary of landforms =

Landforms are categorized by characteristic physical attributes such as their creating process, shape, elevation, slope, orientation, rock exposure, and soil type.

== Landforms by process ==
Landforms organized by the processes that create them.

=== Aeolian landforms ===
Aeolian landform – Landforms produced by action of the winds include:

- Barchan – Crescent-shaped dune
- Blowout – Depressions in a sand dune ecosystem caused by the removal of sediments by wind
- Desert pavement – Type of desert earth surface
- Desert varnish – Orange-to-black rock coating in arid environments
- Dry lake – Area that contained a standing surface water body
- Dune – Hill of loose sand built by aeolian processes or the flow of water
- Erg – Broad area of desert covered with wind-swept sand
- Hamada – Desert landscape with mostly rock instead of sand
- Inland dune – Sand dunes found outside of coastal areas
- Médanos - continental dunes
- Mushroom rock – Mushroom-shaped rock formation
- Paha – Type of loess hill
- Ripple marks – Wave structures created in sediments by bottom current
- Sandhill – Type of ecological community or xeric wildfire-maintained ecosystem
- Sastrugi – Sharp irregular grooves or ridges formed on a snow surface
- Snowdrift – Snow deposit sculpted by wind into a mound during a snowstorm
- Tukulan – Land forms in Yakutia, Russian Federation
- Ventifact – Rock that has been eroded by wind-driven sand or ice crystals
- Yardang – Streamlined aeolian landform

=== Coastal and oceanic landforms ===
Coastal and oceanic landforms include:

- Abyssal fan – Underwater geological structures associated with large-scale sediment deposition
- Abyssal plain – Flat area on the deep ocean floor
- Archipelago – Collection of islands
- Atoll – Ring-shaped coral reef
- Arch – Arch-shaped natural rock formation
- Ayre – Shingle beaches in Orkney and Shetland
- Barrier bar – Natural submerged sandbank that rises from a body of water to near the surface
- Barrier island – Coastal dune landform that forms by wave and tidal action parallel to the mainland coast
- Bay – Recessed, coastal body of water connected to an ocean or lake
- Baymouth bar – Sandbar across the bay mouth
- Beach – Area of loose particles at the edge of a body of water
- Raised beach – Emergent coastal landform
- Beach cusps – Shoreline formations made up of various grades of sediment in an arc pattern
- Beach ridge – Wave-swept or wave-deposited ridge running parallel to a shoreline
- Bight – Shallowly concave bend or curve in a coastline, river, or other geographical feature
- Blowhole – Hole at the top of a sea-cave which allows waves to force water or spray out of the hole
- Channel – Narrow body of water
- Cape – Large headland extending into a body of water, usually the sea
- Calanque – Narrow inlet on the Mediterranean coast
- Cliff – Tall, near vertical rock face
- Coast – Area where land meets the sea or ocean
- Continental shelf – Coastal and oceanic landform
- Coral reef – Outcrop of rock in the sea formed by the growth and deposit of stony coral skeletons
- Cove – Small sheltered bay or coastal inlet
- Cuspate foreland – Geographical features found on coastlines and lakeshores
- Dune system – Hill of loose sand built by aeolian processes or the flow of water
- Estuary – Partially enclosed coastal body of brackish water
- Firth – Scottish word used for various coastal inlets and straits
- Fjard – Glacially formed, broad, shallow inlet
- Fjord – Long, narrow inlet with steep sides or cliffs, created by glacial activity
- Geo – Inlet, a gully or a narrow and deep cleft in the face of a cliff
- Gulf – Recessed, coastal body of water connected to an ocean or lake
  - List of gulfs
- Headland – Landform extending into a body of water, often with significant height and drop
- Inlet – Indentation of a shoreline
- Island – Piece of subcontinental land surrounded by water
- Islet – Very small island
- Isthmus – Strip of land connecting two larger areas
- Lagoon – Shallow body of water separated from a larger one by a narrow landform
- Machair – Fertile low-lying grassy plain
- Marine terrace – Emergent coastal landform
- Mid-ocean ridge – Basaltic underwater mountain system formed by plate tectonic spreading
- Ocean bank – Part of the sea which is shallow compared to its surrounding area
- Ocean basin – Geologic basin under the sea
- Oceanic plateau – Relatively flat submarine region that rises well above the level of the ambient seabed
- Oceanic ridge – An underwater mountain system formed by plate tectonic spreading
- Oceanic trench – Long and narrow depressions of the sea floor
- Peninsula – Land feature
- Promontory – Prominent mass of land that overlooks lower-lying land or a body of water
- Ria – Coastal inlet formed by the partial submergence of an unglaciated river valley
- River delta – Silt deposition landform at the mouth of a river
- Salt marsh – Coastal ecosystem between land and open saltwater that is regularly flooded
- Sea cave – Cave formed by the wave action of the sea
- Seamount – Mountain rising from the ocean seafloor that does not reach the water's surface
- Seamount chains – Mountain rising from the ocean seafloor that does not reach the water's surface
- Shoal – Natural submerged sandbank that rises from a body of water to near the surface
- Shore – Area where land meets the sea or ocean
- Skerry – Rocky island smaller than an islet
- Sound – Long, wide body of water, connecting two larger bodies
- Spit – Coastal bar or beach landform deposited by longshore drift
- Strait – Waterway connecting two bodies of water
- Strandflat – Type of landform found in high-latitude areas
- Stack – Geological landform consisting of a steep and often vertical column or columns of rock, and stump
- Submarine canyon – Steep-sided valley cut into the seabed of the continental slope
- Surge channel – Type of coastal landform
- Tessellated pavement – Flat rock surface subdivided by fractures
- Tidal island – Island accessible by foot at low tide
- Tidal marsh – Marsh subject to tidal change in water
- Tide pool – Rocky pool on a seashore, separated from the sea at low tide, filled with seawater
- Tied island – Island that is connected to land only by a tombolo
- Tombolo – Deposition landform in which an island is connected to the mainland by a sandy isthmus
- Volcanic arc – Chain of volcanoes formed above a subducting plate
- Wave-cut platform – Narrow flat area created by erosion

=== Cryogenic landforms ===
Landforms produced by or in low-temperatures include:

- Blockfield – Surface covered by irregular rocks
- Cryoplanation terrace – Formation of plains, terraces and pediments in periglacial environments
- Earth hummocks – Small knoll or mound above ground
- Kurum – Mantle of loose rocks moving by creeping on gentle slopes
- Lithalsa – Frost-induced raised land form in permafrost areas
- Nivation hollow – Geomorphic processes associated with snow patches
- Palsa – Low frost heave in polar and subpolar climates
- Permafrost plateau – Low frost heave in polar and subpolar climates
- Pingo – Mound of earth-covered ice
- Rock glacier – Glacial landform
- Solifluction lobes and sheets – Freeze-thaw mass wasting slope processes
- Thermokarst – Irregular land surface of marshy hollows and small hummocks formed when permafrost thaws

=== Erosion landforms ===
Landforms produced by erosion and weathering usually occur in rocky or fluvial environments, and many also appear under those headings.

- Arête – Narrow ridge formed by glacial erosion
- Badlands – Type of heavily eroded terrain
- Bornhardt – Large, dome-shaped, steep-sided, bald rock
- Butte – Isolated hill with steep, often vertical sides and a small, relatively flat top
- Canyon – Deep chasm between cliffs
- Cave – Natural void under a planetary surface
- Cirque – Amphitheatre-like valley formed by glacial erosion
- Cliff – Tall, near vertical rock face
- Chink, regional term in Central Asia for steep chalk and limestone escarpments and cliffs of height up to 350m, often around flat-top elevations
- Cryoplanation terrace – Formation of plains, terraces and pediments in periglacial environments
- Cuesta – Hill or ridge with a gentle slope on one side and a steep slope on the other
- Danxia – Erosive landform found in China
- Dissected plateau – Plateaus area that has been severely eroded so that the relief is sharp
- Erg – Broad area of desert covered with wind-swept sand
- Etchplain – Plain where the bedrock has been subject to considerable subsurface weathering
- Exhumed river channel – Ridge of sandstone that remains when the softer flood plain mudstone is eroded away
- Fjord – Long, narrow inlet with steep sides or cliffs, created by glacial activity
- Flared slope – Rock-wall with a smooth transition into a concavity at the foot zone
- Flatiron – Steeply sloping triangular landform
- Gulch – Deep V-shaped valley formed by erosion
- Gully – Landform created by running water and/or mass movement eroding sharply into soil
- Hogback – Long, narrow ridge
- Hoodoo – Tall, thin spire of relatively soft rock usually topped by harder rock
- Homoclinal ridge – Ridge with a moderate sloping backslope and steeper frontslope
- Inselberg, also known as Monadnock – Isolated, steep rock hill on relatively flat terrain
- Inverted relief – Landscape features that have reversed their elevation relative to other features
- Lavaka – Type of gully, formed via groundwater sapping
- Limestone pavement – Natural karst landform consisting of a flat, incised surface of exposed limestone
- Mesa – Elevated area of land with a flat top and sides, usually much wider than buttes
- Mushroom rock – Mushroom-shaped rock formation
- Natural arch – Arch-shaped natural rock formation
- Outcrop – Visible exposure of bedrock or ancient superficial deposits on the surface of the Earth
- Paleoplain - A buried erosion plain; a particularly large and flat erosion surface
- Pediment – Very gently sloping inclined bedrock surface
- Pediplain – Extensive plain formed by the coalescence of pediments
- Peneplain – Low-relief plain formed by protracted erosion
- Planation surface – Large-scale land surface that is almost flat
- Potrero – Long mesa that at one end slopes upward to higher terrain
- Ridge – Long, narrow, elevated landform
- Rôche moutonnée – Rock formation created by the passing of a glacier
- List of rock formations
- Strike ridge – Ridge with a moderate sloping backslope and steeper frontslope
- Structural bench – Long, relatively narrow land bounded by distinctly steeper slopes above and below
- Structural terrace – Step-like landform
- Tepui – Table-top mountain or mesa in the Guiana Highlands of South America
- Tessellated pavement – Flat rock surface subdivided by fractures
- Truncated spur – Ridge that descends towards a valley floor or coastline that is cut short
- Tor – Large, free-standing rock outcrop on a gentle hill summit
- Valley – Low area between hills, often with a river running through it
- Wave-cut platform – Narrow flat area created by erosion
- Wind gap – Topographic gap made by a former waterway

=== Fluvial landforms ===
Fluvial – Natural flowing freshwater stream landforms include:

- Ait – Small river islands (British English)
- Alluvial fan – Fan-shaped deposit of sediment
- Anabranch – Part of a river or stream that diverts from and rejoins the main channel
- Arroyo – Dry watercourse with flow after rain
- Asymmetric valley – Valley that has steeper slopes on one side
- Backswamp – Environment on a floodplain where deposits settle after a flood
- Bajada – Compound alluvial fan
- Bar – Natural submerged sandbank that rises from a body of water to near the surface
- Bayou – Body of water in flat, low-lying areas
- Bench – Long, relatively narrow land bounded by distinctly steeper slopes above and below
- Braided channel – Network of river channels
- Canyon – Deep chasm between cliffs
- Cave – Natural void under a planetary surface
- Cliff – Tall, near vertical rock face
- Cut bank – Outside bank of a water channel, which is continually undergoing erosion
- Crevasse splay – Sediment deposited on a floodplain by a stream which breaks its levees
- Confluence – Meeting of two or more bodies of flowing water
- Drainage basin – Land area where water converges to a common outlet
- Drainage divide – Elevated terrain that separates neighbouring drainage basins
- Endorheic basin – Closed drainage basin that has no outflow
- Entrenched meander – One of a series of curves in a channel of a matured stream
- Epigenetic valley – Valley created by erosion and with little or no sympathy for bedrock structure
- Esker – Long, winding ridge of stratified sand and gravel associated with former glaciers
- Exhumed river channel – Ridge of sandstone that remains when the softer flood plain mudstone is eroded away
- Floodplain – Land adjacent to a water body which is flooded during periods of high water
- Fluvial island – Exposed landmass within a river
- Fluvial terrace – Elongated terraces that flank the sides of floodplains and river valleys
- Gorge – Deep chasm between cliffs
- Gully – Landform created by running water and/or mass movement eroding sharply into soil
- Levee – Ridge or wall to hold back water
- Marsh – Low-lying and seasonally waterlogged land
- Meander – One of a series of curves in a channel of a matured stream
- Misfit stream – River too large or too small to have eroded the valley or cave passage in which it flows
- Narrows – Restricted land or water passage
- Oxbow lake – U-shaped lake or pool left by an ancient river meander
- Palaeochannel – Inactive river or stream channel that has been filled or buried
- Point bar – Landform related to streams and rivers
- Plunge pool – Depression at the base of a waterfall
- Pothole – Natural bowl-shaped hollow carved into a streambed
- Rapids – River section with increased velocity and turbulence
- Riffle – Shallow landform in a flowing channel
- River – Natural flowing freshwater stream
- River delta – Silt deposition landform at the mouth of a river
- River island – Exposed landmass within a river
- River source – Starting point of a river
- Rock-cut basin – Cylindrical depression cut into stream or river beds
- Shut-in – Type of rock formation found in Ozarks streams
- Thalweg – Line of lowest points along a watercourse or valley
- Towhead – Exposed landmass within a river
- Shoal – Natural submerged sandbank that rises from a body of water to near the surface
- Spring – A point at which water emenges from an aquifer to the surface
- Strath – Large valley
- Stream – Body of surface water flowing down a channel
- Stream pool – Deep and slow-moving stretch of a watercourse
- Swamp – Forested wetland
- Valley – Low area between hills, often with a river running through it
- Vale – Low area between hills, often with a river running through it
- Wadi – Hydrological feature
- Waterfall – Point in a river or brook where water flows over a vertical drop
- Watershed – Land area where water converges to a common outlet
- Yazoo stream – Hydrologic term
- V-shaped valley – Low area between hills, often with a river running through it

=== Impact landforms ===
Landforms created by extraterrestrial impacts – Collision of two astronomical objects – include:

- Central peak – Large impact craters with uplifted centres
- Complex crater – Large impact craters with uplifted centres
- Cratered landscape
- Ejecta blanket – Layer of material thrown out of an impact crater
- Impact crater – Circular depression in a solid astronomical body formed by the impact of a smaller object
- Impact crater lake – Lake formed within an impact crater
- Simple crater – Circular depression in a solid astronomical body formed by the impact of a smaller object

=== Lacustrine landforms ===
Lacustrine – associated with lakes – landforms include:

- Alpine lake – High-altitude lake in a mountainous zone
- Beach – Area of loose particles at the edge of a body of water
- Raised beach – Emergent coastal landform
- Carolina bay – Elliptical depressions concentrated along the Atlantic seaboard of North America
- Dry lake – Area that contained a standing surface water body
- Chott – Dry lake in the Saharan area of Africa
- Endorheic basin – Closed drainage basin that has no outflow
- Gilgai – Small, ephemeral lake in expanding clay soils
- Lacustrine plain – Lakes filled by sediment
- Lacustrine terraces – Step-like landform
- Lake – Large inland body of relatively still water
- Oasis – Fertile area in a desert environment
- Oxbow lake – U-shaped lake or pool left by an ancient river meander
- Pond – Relatively small body of standing water
- Proglacial lake – Lake formed by the action of ice
- Salt pan, also known as salt flat – Flat expanse of ground covered with salt and other minerals

=== Mountain and glacial landforms ===
Mountain and glacial landform – Landform created by the action of glaciers – include:

- Arête – Narrow ridge formed by glacial erosion formed by glacial movement
- Cirque – Amphitheatre-like valley formed by glacial erosion
- Col – Lowest point on a mountain ridge between two peaks
- Cordillera – Extensive chain of mountains or mountain ranges
- Crevasse – Deep crack, or fracture, in an ice sheet or glacier
- Corrie – Amphitheatre-like valley formed by glacial erosion or cwm
- Cove (mountain) – Small valley in the Appalachian Mountains between two ridge lines
- Dirt cone – Depositional glacial feature of ice or snow with an insulating layer of dirt
- Drumlin – Elongated hill formed by glacial action and drumlin field – Elongated hill formed by glacial action
- Esker – Long, winding ridge of stratified sand and gravel associated with former glaciers
- Fjord – Long, narrow inlet with steep sides or cliffs, created by glacial activity
- Fluvial terrace – Elongated terraces that flank the sides of floodplains and river valleys
- Flyggberg – Isolated, steep rock hill on relatively flat terrain
- Geest – Land formation common in northern Germany, Denmark, and the Netherlands
- Glacier – Persistent body of ice that moves downhill under its own weight
- Glacier cave – Cave formed within the ice of a glacier
- Glacier foreland – Area between the leading edge of a glacier and the moraines of latest maximum
- Hanging valley – A tributary valley that meets the main valley above the valley floor
- Highland – Area of high elevation such as a mountainous region or elevated mountainous plateau
- Hill – Landform that extends above the surrounding terrain
- Inselberg, also known as monadnock – Isolated, steep rock hill on relatively flat terrain
- Kame – Mound formed on a retreating glacier and deposited on land
- Kame delta – Glacial melt water landform
- Kettle – Depression formed by glaciers or floodwaters
- Moraine – Glacially formed accumulation of debris
  - Rogen moraine, also known as Ribbed moraines – Landform of ridges deposited by a glacier or ice sheet transverse to ice flow
- Moulin – Shaft within a glacier or ice sheet which water enters from the surface
- Mountain – Large natural elevation of the Earth's surface
- Mountain pass – Route through a mountain range or over a ridge
- Mountain range – Geographic area containing several geologically related mountains
- Nunatak – Landform within an ice field or glacier
- Proglacial lake – Lake formed by the action of ice
- Pyramidal peak, also known as Glacial horn – Angular, sharply pointed mountainous peak
- Outwash fan – Type of sediment deposition by a melting glacier
- Outwash plain – Plain formed from glacier sediment transported by meltwater
- Rift valley – Linear lowland created by a tectonic rift or fault
- Rôche moutonnée – Rock formation created by the passing of a glacier
- Sandur – Plain formed from glacier sediment transported by meltwater
- Side valley – Valley with a tributary to a larger river
- Summit – Point on a surface with a higher elevation than all immediately adjacent points
- Trim line – Clear line on the side of a valley marking the most recent highest extent of the glacier
- Truncated spur – Ridge that descends towards a valley floor or coastline that is cut short
- Tunnel valley – Glacial-formed geographic feature
- Valley – Low area between hills, often with a river running through it
- U-shaped valley – Valleys formed by glacial scouring

=== Slope landforms ===
Slope landforms include:

- Bluff – Tall, near vertical rock face
- Butte – Isolated hill with steep, often vertical sides and a small, relatively flat top
- Canyon – Deep chasm between cliffs
- Cliff – Tall, near vertical rock face
- Col – Lowest point on a mountain ridge between two peaks
- Cuesta – Hill or ridge with a gentle slope on one side and a steep slope on the other
- Dale – Low area between hills, often with a river running through it
- Defile – Narrow pass or gorge between mountains or hills
- Dell – Small secluded hollow
- Doab, also known as interfluve – Land between two converging, or confluent, rivers
- Draw – Long area of downward-sloping low ground
- Escarpment, also known as scarp – Steep slope or cliff separating two relatively level regions
- Fall line – Meeting point of uplands and coastal plain
- Flat (landform) – Relatively level surface of land within a region of greater relief
- Glen – Name for valley commonly used in Ireland, Scotland and the Isle of Man
- Gully – Landform created by running water and/or mass movement eroding sharply into soil
- Hill – Landform that extends above the surrounding terrain
- Hillock, also known as Knoll – Small hill
- Mesa – Elevated area of land with a flat top and sides, usually much wider than buttes
- Mountain pass – Route through a mountain range or over a ridge
- Plain – Expanse of land that is mostly flat
- Plateau – Highland area, usually of relatively flat terrain
- Ravine – Small valley, often due to stream erosion
- Ridge – Long, narrow, elevated landform
- Rock shelter – Shallow cave-like opening at the base of a bluff or cliff
- Saddle – Land connecting two high points
- Scree – Rock fragments weathered from larger mass
- Solifluction lobes and sheets – Freeze-thaw mass wasting slope processes
- Strath – Large valley
- Summit – Point on a surface with a higher elevation than all immediately adjacent points
- Terrace – Step-like landform
- Terracette – Small natural step-arranged soil ridges on hillsides
- Vale – Low area between hills, often with a river running through it
- Valley – Low area between hills, often with a river running through it
- Valley shoulder – Low area between hills, often with a river running through it

=== Tectonic landforms ===
Landforms created by tectonic activity include:

- Asymmetric valley – Valley that has steeper slopes on one side
- Dome – Geological deformation structure
- Faceted spur – Ridge that descends towards a valley floor or coastline that is cut short
- Fault scarp – Small vertical offset on the ground surface
- Graben – Depressed block of planetary crust bordered by parallel normal faults
- Half-graben – Geological structure bounded by a fault along one side of its boundaries
- Horst – Raised fault block bounded by normal faults
- Mid-ocean ridge – Basaltic underwater mountain system formed by plate tectonic spreading
- Mud volcano – Landform created by the eruption of mud or slurries, water, and gases
- Oceanic trench – Long and narrow depressions of the sea floor
- Pull-apart basin – Type of basin in geology
- Rift valley – Linear lowland created by a tectonic rift or fault
- Sand boil – Cone formed by the ejection of sand on a surface from a central point
- Triple junction – Meeting point of three tectonic plates

=== Volcanic landforms ===
Volcanic landforms include:

- Caldera – Cauldron-like volcanic feature formed by the emptying of a magma chamber
- Cinder cone – Steep hill of pyroclastic fragments around a volcanic vent
- Complex volcano – Landform of more than one related volcanic centre
- Cryptodome – Roughly circular protrusion from slowly extruded viscous volcanic lava
- Cryovolcano – Volcano that erupts gases and volatile material
- Diatreme – Volcanic pipe associated with a gaseous explosion
- Dike – Sheet of rock that is formed in a fracture of a pre-existing rock body
- Fissure vent – Linear volcanic vent through which lava erupts
- Geyser – Natural explosive eruption of hot water
- Guyot – Flat-topped underwater mountain
- Hornito – Conical structure built by lava ejected through the crust of a lava flow
- Kīpuka – Area of land surrounded by one or more younger lava flows
- Lava – Molten rock expelled by a volcano during an eruption
- Lava dome – Roughly circular protrusion from slowly extruded viscous volcanic lava
- Lava coulee – Roughly circular protrusion from slowly extruded viscous volcanic lava
- Lava field, also known as lava plain – Large, mostly flat area of lava flows
- Lava lake – Molten lava contained in a volcanic crater
- Lava spine – Vertical growth of solid volcanic lava
- Lava tube – Natural conduit through which lava flows beneath the solid surface
- Maar – Low-relief volcanic crater
- Malpais – Rough and barren landscape of relict and largely uneroded lava fields
- Mamelon – Type of volcanic rock formation
- Mid-ocean ridge – Basaltic underwater mountain system formed by plate tectonic spreading
- Pit crater – Depression formed by collapse of the surface into a void
- Pyroclastic shield – Shield volcano formed mostly of pyroclastic and highly explosive eruptions
- Resurgent dome – Volcanic landform
- Rootless cone, also known as pseudocrater – Volcanic landform
- Seamount – Mountain rising from the ocean seafloor that does not reach the water's surface
- Shield volcano – Low-profile volcano usually formed almost entirely of fluid lava flows
- Stratovolcano – Type of conical volcano composed of layers of lava and tephra
- Somma volcano – Volcanic caldera that has been partially filled by a new central cone
- Spatter cone – Landform of ejecta from a volcanic vent piled up in a conical shape
- Volcanic crater lake – Lake formed within a volcanic crater
- Subglacial mound – Volcano formed when lava erupts beneath a thick glacier or ice sheet
- Submarine volcano – Underwater vents or fissures in the Earth's surface from which magma can erupt
- Supervolcano – Volcano that has erupted with a volcanic explosivity index of 8
- Tuff cone – Landform of ejecta from a volcanic vent piled up in a conical shape
- Tuya – Flat-topped, steep-sided volcano
- Volcanic vent – Rupture in a planet's crust where material escapes
- Volcanic cone – Landform of ejecta from a volcanic vent piled up in a conical shape
- Volcanic crater – Roughly circular depression in the ground caused by volcanic activity
- Volcanic dam – Natural dam produced directly or indirectly by volcanism
- Volcanic field – Area of Earth's crust prone to localized volcanic activity
- Volcanic group – Collection of related volcanoes or volcanic landforms
- Volcanic island – Island of volcanic origin
- Volcanic plateau – Plateau produced by volcanic activity
- Volcanic plug – Volcanic object created when magma hardens within a vent on an active volcano
- Volcano – Rupture in a planet's crust where material escapes

=== Weathering landforms ===
Weathering landforms include:

- Bornhardt – Large, dome-shaped, steep-sided, bald rock
- Etchplain – Plain where the bedrock has been subject to considerable subsurface weathering
- Flared slope – Rock-wall with a smooth transition into a concavity at the foot zone
- Flute
- Honeycomb weathering – Form of cavernous weathering and subcategory of tafoni
- Inselberg – Isolated, steep rock hill on relatively flat terrain
- Karst – Topography from dissolved soluble rocks
- Nubbin – Small hill of bedrock with rounded residual blocks
- Panhole – Depression or basin eroded into flat or gently sloping cohesive rock (Weathering pit)
- Tafoni – Small to large indentations in vertical to steeply sloping granular rock
- Tor – Large, free-standing rock outcrop on a gentle hill summit

== Landforms by shape ==
=== Positive landforms ===
- Bornhardt – Large, dome-shaped, steep-sided, bald rock
- Cinder cone – Steep hill of pyroclastic fragments around a volcanic vent
- Cryptodome – Roughly circular protrusion from slowly extruded viscous volcanic lava
- Dome – Geological deformation structure
- Drumlin – Elongated hill formed by glacial action
- Granite dome – Rounded hills of bare granite formed by exfoliation
- Hillock – Small hill
- Inselberg – Isolated, steep rock hill on relatively flat terrain
- Lava dome – Roughly circular protrusion from slowly extruded viscous volcanic lava
- Lava spine – Vertical growth of solid volcanic lava
- Mesa – Elevated area of land with a flat top and sides, usually much wider than buttes
- Mogote – Steep-sided residual hill of limestone, marble, or dolomite on a flat plain
- Nubbin – Small hill of bedrock with rounded residual blocks
- Palsa – Low frost heave in polar and subpolar climates
- Pingo – Mound of earth-covered ice
- Pyroclastic shield – Shield volcano formed mostly of pyroclastic and highly explosive eruptions
- Resurgent dome – Volcanic landform
- Seamount – Mountain rising from the ocean seafloor that does not reach the water's surface
- Shield volcano – Low-profile volcano usually formed almost entirely of fluid lava flows
- Stratocone – Type of conical volcano composed of layers of lava and tephra
- Stratovolcano – Type of conical volcano composed of layers of lava and tephra
- Tor – Large, free-standing rock outcrop on a gentle hill summit
- Tower karst – Tall structures of soluble rock
- Tuya – Flat-topped, steep-sided volcano
- Volcanic cone – Landform of ejecta from a volcanic vent piled up in a conical shape
- Volcanic island – Island of volcanic origin

=== Depressions ===
- Caldera – Cauldron-like volcanic feature formed by the emptying of a magma chamber
- Cave – Natural void under a planetary surface
- Cenote – Natural pit or sinkhole that exposes groundwater underneath
- Cirque – Amphitheatre-like valley formed by glacial erosion
- Crevasse – Deep crack, or fracture, in an ice sheet or glacier
- Deflation hollow – Depressions in a sand dune ecosystem caused by the removal of sediments by wind
- Doline – Geologically-formed topological depression
- Gnamma – Depression or basin eroded into flat or gently sloping cohesive rock
- Graben – Depressed block of planetary crust bordered by parallel normal faults
- Honeycomb weathering – Form of cavernous weathering and subcategory of tafoni
- Impact crater – Circular depression in a solid astronomical body formed by the impact of a smaller object
- Joint valley
- Kettle – Depression formed by glaciers or floodwaters
- Lagoon – Shallow body of water separated from a larger one by a narrow landform
- Lake – Large inland body of relatively still water
- Lava lake – Molten lava contained in a volcanic crater
- Maar – Low-relief volcanic crater
- Nivation hollow – Geomorphic processes associated with snow patches
- Oxbow lake – U-shaped lake or pool left by an ancient river meander
- Panhole – Depression or basin eroded into flat or gently sloping cohesive rock
- Pothole – Natural bowl-shaped hollow carved into a streambed
- Plunge pool – Depression at the base of a waterfall
- Pond – Relatively small body of standing water
- Pull-apart basin – Type of basin in geology
- Quarry – Place where geological material has been excavated
- Rift – Part of a volcano where a set of linear cracks form
- Sea cave – Cave formed by the wave action of the sea
- Sinkhole – Geologically-formed topological depression
- Sor – Closed drainless depression characteristic of the Central Asian deserts
- Tafoni – Small to large indentations in vertical to steeply sloping granular rock
- Thermokarst – Irregular land surface of marshy hollows and small hummocks formed when permafrost thaws
- Volcanic crater – Roughly circular depression in the ground caused by volcanic activity
- Volcanic dam – Natural dam produced directly or indirectly by volcanism

=== Flat landforms ===
- Abyssal fan – Underwater geological structures associated with large-scale sediment deposition
- Abyssal plain – Flat area on the deep ocean floor
- Bench – Long, relatively narrow land bounded by distinctly steeper slopes above and below
- Butte – Isolated hill with steep, often vertical sides and a small, relatively flat top
- Coastal plain – Area of flat, low-lying land adjacent to a seacoast
- Continental shelf – Coastal and oceanic landform
- Cryoplanation terrace – Formation of plains, terraces and pediments in periglacial environments
- Dissected plateau – Plateaus area that has been severely eroded so that the relief is sharp
- Etchplain – Plain where the bedrock has been subject to considerable subsurface weathering
- Floodplain – Land adjacent to a water body which is flooded during periods of high water
- Fluvial terrace – Elongated terraces that flank the sides of floodplains and river valleys
- Inselberg plain – Isolated, steep rock hill on relatively flat terrain
- Lacustrine terrace – Step-like landform
- Lava field, also known as lava plain – Large, mostly flat area of lava flows
- Oceanic basin – Geologic basin under the sea
- Oceanic plateau – Relatively flat submarine region that rises well above the level of the ambient seabed
- Outwash fan – Type of sediment deposition by a melting glacier
- Outwash plain – Plain formed from glacier sediment transported by meltwater
- Paleoplain - A buried erosion plain; a particularly large and flat erosion surface
- Pediplain – Extensive plain formed by the coalescence of pediments
- Peneplain – Low-relief plain formed by protracted erosion
- Plain – Expanse of land that is mostly flat
- Planation surface – Large-scale land surface that is almost flat
- Plateau – Highland area, usually of relatively flat terrain
- Polje – Type of large plain found in karst regions
- Raised beach, also known as Marine terrace – Emergent coastal landform
- River delta – Silt deposition landform at the mouth of a river
- Salt marsh – Coastal ecosystem between land and open saltwater that is regularly flooded
- Salt pan – Flat expanse of ground covered with salt and other minerals
- Sandur – Plain formed from glacier sediment transported by meltwater
- Strandflat – Type of landform found in high-latitude areas
- Strath – Large valley
- Swamp – Forested wetland
- Table – Raised landform with a flat top
- Tidal marsh – Marsh subject to tidal change in water
- Tepui – Table-top mountain or mesa in the Guiana Highlands of South America
- Volcanic plateau – Plateau produced by volcanic activity
- Wave-cut platform – Narrow flat area created by erosion

== Landforms, alphabetic ==
- Abîme – Vertical shaft in karst
- Abyssal fan – Underwater geological structures associated with large-scale sediment deposition
- Abyssal plain – Flat area on the deep ocean floor
- Ait – Small river islands (British English)
- Alluvial fan – Fan-shaped deposit of sediment
- Alpine lake – High-altitude lake in a mountainous zone
- Anabranch – Part of a river or stream that diverts from and rejoins the main channel
- Arch – Arch-shaped natural rock formation
- Archipelago – Collection of islands
- Arête – Narrow ridge formed by glacial erosion
- Arroyo – Dry watercourse with flow after rain
- Atoll – Ring-shaped coral reef
- Ayre – Shingle beaches in Orkney and Shetland
- Badlands – Type of heavily eroded terrain
- Bajada – Compound alluvial fan
- Bar – Natural submerged sandbank that rises from a body of water to near the surface
- Barchan – Crescent-shaped dune
- Barrier bar – Natural submerged sandbank that rises from a body of water to near the surface
- Barrier island – Coastal dune landform that forms by wave and tidal action parallel to the mainland coast
- Bay – Recessed, coastal body of water connected to an ocean or lake
- Baymouth bar – Sandbar across the bay mouth
- Bayou – Body of water in flat, low-lying areas
- Beach – Area of loose particles at the edge of a body of water
- Beach cusps – Shoreline formations made up of various grades of sediment in an arc pattern
- Beach ridge – Wave-swept or wave-deposited ridge running parallel to a shoreline
- Bench – Long, relatively narrow land bounded by distinctly steeper slopes above and below
- Bight – Shallowly concave bend or curve in a coastline, river, or other geographical feature
- Blowhole – Hole at the top of a sea-cave which allows waves to force water or spray out of the hole
- Blowout – Depressions in a sand dune ecosystem caused by the removal of sediments by wind
- Bluff – Tall, near vertical rock face
- Bornhardt – Large, dome-shaped, steep-sided, bald rock
- Braided channel – Network of river channels
- Butte – Isolated hill with steep, often vertical sides and a small, relatively flat top
- Calanque – Narrow inlet on the Mediterranean coast
- Caldera – Cauldron-like volcanic feature formed by the emptying of a magma chamber
- Canyon – Deep chasm between cliffs
- Cape – Large headland extending into a body of water, usually the sea
- Carolina bay – Elliptical depressions concentrated along the Atlantic seaboard of North America
- Cave – Natural void under a planetary surface
- Cenote – Natural pit or sinkhole that exposes groundwater underneath
- Channel – Narrow body of water
- Cirque – Amphitheatre-like valley formed by glacial erosion
- Corrie – Amphitheatre-like valley formed by glacial erosion or cwm
- Cliff – Tall, near vertical rock face
- Coast – Area where land meets the sea or ocean
- Coastal plain – Area of flat, low-lying land adjacent to a seacoast
- Col – Lowest point on a mountain ridge between two peaks
- Complex crater – Large impact craters with uplifted centres
- Complex volcano – Landform of more than one related volcanic centre
- Confluence – Meeting of two or more bodies of flowing water
- Continental shelf – Coastal and oceanic landform
- Coral reef – Outcrop of rock in the sea formed by the growth and deposit of stony coral skeletons
- Cordillera – Extensive chain of mountains or mountain ranges
- Cove – Small sheltered bay or coastal inlet
- Cove (mountain) – Small valley in the Appalachian Mountains between two ridge lines
- Crater – Depression caused by an impact or geologic activity
- Crevasse splay – Sediment deposited on a floodplain by a stream which breaks its levees
- Crevasse – Deep crack, or fracture, in an ice sheet or glacier
- Cryovolcano – Volcano that erupts gases and volatile material
- Cuesta – Hill or ridge with a gentle slope on one side and a steep slope on the other
- Cuspate foreland – Geographical features found on coastlines and lakeshores
- Cut bank – Outside bank of a water channel, which is continually undergoing erosion
- Dale – Low area between hills, often with a river running through it
- Defile – Narrow pass or gorge between mountains or hills
- Dell – Small secluded hollow
- Depression – Landform sunken or depressed below the surrounding area
- Delta, River – Silt deposition landform at the mouth of a river
- Desert pavement – Type of desert earth surface
- Desert varnish – Orange-to-black rock coating in arid environments
- Diatreme – Volcanic pipe associated with a gaseous explosion
- Dike – Sheet of rock that is formed in a fracture of a pre-existing rock body
- Dirt cone – Depositional glacial feature of ice or snow with an insulating layer of dirt
- Dissected plateau – Plateaus area that has been severely eroded so that the relief is sharp
- Doab – Land between two converging, or confluent, rivers
- Doline – Geologically-formed topological depression
- Dome – Geological deformation structure
- Drainage basin – Land area where water converges to a common outlet
- Drainage divide – Elevated terrain that separates neighbouring drainage basins
- Draw – Long area of downward-sloping low ground
- Drumlin – Elongated hill formed by glacial action
- Dry lake – Area that contained a standing surface water body
- Dune – Hill of loose sand built by aeolian processes or the flow of water
- Dune system – Hill of loose sand built by aeolian processes or the flow of water
- Ejecta blanket – Layer of material thrown out of an impact crater
- Endorheic basin – Closed drainage basin that has no outflow
- Erg – Broad area of desert covered with wind-swept sand
- Escarpment – Steep slope or cliff separating two relatively level regions (scarp)
- Esker – Long, winding ridge of stratified sand and gravel associated with former glaciers
- Estuary – Partially enclosed coastal body of brackish water
- Exhumed river channel – Ridge of sandstone that remains when the softer flood plain mudstone is eroded away
- Faceted spur – Ridge that descends towards a valley floor or coastline that is cut short
- Fall line – Meeting point of uplands and coastal plain
- Fault scarp – Small vertical offset on the ground surface
- Firth – Scottish word used for various coastal inlets and straits
- Fissure vent – Linear volcanic vent through which lava erupts
- Fjard – Glacially formed, broad, shallow inlet
- Fjord – Long, narrow inlet with steep sides or cliffs, created by glacial activity
- Flat – Relatively level surface of land within a region of greater relief
- Flatiron – Steeply sloping triangular landform
- Floodplain – Land adjacent to a water body which is flooded during periods of high water
- Foothills – Hills before a mountain range
- Fluvial island – Exposed landmass within a river
- Fluvial terrace – Elongated terraces that flank the sides of floodplains and river valleys
- Foiba – Type of deep natural sinkhole
- Geest – Land formation common in northern Germany, Denmark, and the Netherlands
- Geo – Inlet, a gully or a narrow and deep cleft in the face of a cliff
- Geyser – Natural explosive eruption of hot water
- Gilgai – Small, ephemeral lake in expanding clay soils
- Glacial horn – Angular, sharply pointed mountainous peak
- Glacier cave – Cave formed within the ice of a glacier
- Glacier foreland – Area between the leading edge of a glacier and the moraines of latest maximum
- Glacier – Persistent body of ice that moves downhill under its own weight
- Parallel Roads of Glen Roy – Nature reserve in the Highlands of Scotland with ancient shoreline terraces
- Glen – Name for valley commonly used in Ireland, Scotland and the Isle of Man
- Gorge – Deep chasm between cliffs
- Graben – Depressed block of planetary crust bordered by parallel normal faults
- Gulch – Deep V-shaped valley formed by erosion
- Gulf
- Gully – Landform created by running water and/or mass movement eroding sharply into soil
- Guyot – Flat-topped underwater mountain
- Half-graben – Geological structure bounded by a fault along one side of its boundaries
- Hamada – Desert landscape with mostly rock instead of sand
- Hanging valley – A tributary valley that meets the main valley above the valley floor
- Headland – Landform extending into a body of water, often with significant height and drop
- Highland – Area of high elevation such as a mountainous region or elevated mountainous plateau
- Hill – Landform that extends above the surrounding terrain
- Hillock – Small hill
- Hogback – Long, narrow ridge
- Homoclinal ridge – Ridge with a moderate sloping backslope and steeper frontslope
- Hoodoo – Tall, thin spire of relatively soft rock usually topped by harder rock
- Horst – Raised fault block bounded by normal faults
- Impact crater – Circular depression in a solid astronomical body formed by the impact of a smaller object
- Inland dune – Sand dunes found outside of coastal areas
- Inlet – Indentation of a shoreline
- Interfluve – Land between two converging, or confluent, rivers
- Inverted relief – Landscape features that have reversed their elevation relative to other features
- Island – Piece of subcontinental land surrounded by water
- Islet – Very small island
- Isthmus – Strip of land connecting two larger areas
- Kame delta – Glacial melt water landform
- Kame – Mound formed on a retreating glacier and deposited on land
- Karst – Topography from dissolved soluble rocks
- Karst fenster – Unroofed portion of a cavern which reveals part of a subterranean river
- Karst valley – Topography from dissolved soluble rocks
- Kettle – Depression formed by glaciers or floodwaters
- Kīpuka – Area of land surrounded by one or more younger lava flows
- Knoll – Small hill
- Lacustrine plain – Lakes filled by sediment
- Lagoon – Shallow body of water separated from a larger one by a narrow landform
- Lake – Large inland body of relatively still water
- Lava dome – Roughly circular protrusion from slowly extruded viscous volcanic lava
- Lava – Molten rock expelled by a volcano during an eruption
- Lava lake – Molten lava contained in a volcanic crater
- Lava field, also known as lava plain – Large, mostly flat area of lava flows
- Lava spine – Vertical growth of solid volcanic lava
- Lava tube – Natural conduit through which lava flows beneath the solid surface
- Lavaka – Type of gully, formed via groundwater sapping
- Levee – Ridge or wall to hold back water, natural
- Limestone pavement – Natural karst landform consisting of a flat, incised surface of exposed limestone
- Loess – Sediment of accumulated wind-blown dust
- Lacustrine terraces – Step-like landform
- Maar – Low-relief volcanic crater
- Machair – Fertile low-lying grassy plain
- Malpaís – Rough and barren landscape of relict and largely uneroded lava fields
- Mamelon – Type of volcanic rock formation
- Marine terrace – Emergent coastal landform
- Marsh – Low-lying and seasonally waterlogged land
- Massif – Principal mass of a mountain
- Meander – One of a series of curves in a channel of a matured stream
- Médanos
- Mesa – Elevated area of land with a flat top and sides, usually much wider than buttes
- Mid-ocean ridge – Basaltic underwater mountain system formed by plate tectonic spreading
- Mogote – Steep-sided residual hill of limestone, marble, or dolomite on a flat plain
- Monadnock – Isolated, steep rock hill on relatively flat terrain
- Moraine – Glacially formed accumulation of debris
- Moulin – Shaft within a glacier or ice sheet which water enters from the surface
- Mountain – Large natural elevation of the Earth's surface
- Mountain pass – Route through a mountain range or over a ridge
- Mountain range – Geographic area containing several geologically related mountains
- Mud volcano – Landform created by the eruption of mud or slurries, water, and gases
- Mushroom rock – Mushroom-shaped rock formation
- Natural arch – Arch-shaped natural rock formation
- Nunatak – Landform within an ice field or glacier
- Oasis – Fertile area in a desert environment
- Ocean bank – Part of the sea which is shallow compared to its surrounding area
- Oceanic basin – Geologic basin under the sea
- Oceanic plateau – Relatively flat submarine region that rises well above the level of the ambient seabed
- Oceanic ridge – An underwater mountain system formed by plate tectonic spreading
- Oceanic trench – Long and narrow depressions of the sea floor
- Outcrop – Visible exposure of bedrock or ancient superficial deposits on the surface of the Earth
- Outwash fan – Type of sediment deposition by a melting glacier
- Outwash plain – Plain formed from glacier sediment transported by meltwater
- Oxbow lake – U-shaped lake or pool left by an ancient river meander
- Paha – Type of loess hill
- Palaeochannel – Inactive river or stream channel that has been filled or buried
- Paleoplain - A buried erosion plain; a particularly large and flat erosion surface
- Panhole – Depression or basin eroded into flat or gently sloping cohesive rock
- Pediment – Very gently sloping inclined bedrock surface
- Pediplain – Extensive plain formed by the coalescence of pediments
- Peneplain – Low-relief plain formed by protracted erosion
- Peninsula – Land feature
- Pingo – Mound of earth-covered ice
- Pit crater – Depression formed by collapse of the surface into a void
- Plain – Expanse of land that is mostly flat
- Plateau – Highland area, usually of relatively flat terrain
- Playa lake – Area that contained a standing surface water body
- Plunge pool – Depression at the base of a waterfall
- Point bar – Landform related to streams and rivers
- Polje – Type of large plain found in karst regions
- Pond – Relatively small body of standing water
- Pothole – Natural bowl-shaped hollow carved into a streambed
- Potrero – Long mesa that at one end slopes upward to higher terrain
- Proglacial lake – Lake formed by the action of ice
- Promontory – Prominent mass of land that overlooks lower-lying land or a body of water
- Pseudocrater – Volcanic landform
- Pull-apart basin – Type of basin in geology
- Quarry – Place where geological material has been excavated
- Raised beach – Emergent coastal landform
- Rapids – River section with increased velocity and turbulence
- Ravine – Small valley, often due to stream erosion
- Ria – Coastal inlet formed by the partial submergence of an unglaciated river valley
- Ridge – Long, narrow, elevated landform
- Riffle – Shallow landform in a flowing channel
- Rift valley – Linear lowland created by a tectonic rift or fault
- Ripple marks – Wave structures created in sediments by bottom current
- River – Natural flowing freshwater stream
- River delta – Silt deposition landform at the mouth of a river
- River island – Exposed landmass within a river
- River source – Starting point of a river
- Rôche moutonnée – Rock formation created by the passing of a glacier
- Rogen moraine – Landform of ridges deposited by a glacier or ice sheet transverse to ice flow
- Rock formations
- Rock shelter – Shallow cave-like opening at the base of a bluff or cliff
- Rock-cut basin – Cylindrical depression cut into stream or river beds
- Saddle – Land connecting two high points
- Salt marsh – Coastal ecosystem between land and open saltwater that is regularly flooded
- Salt pan – Flat expanse of ground covered with salt and other minerals (salt flat)
- Sand boil, also known as sand volcano – Cone formed by the ejection of sand on a surface from a central point
- Sandhill – Type of ecological community or xeric wildfire-maintained ecosystem
- Sandur – Plain formed from glacier sediment transported by meltwater
- Sastrugi – Sharp irregular grooves or ridges formed on a snow surface
- Scowle – Type of landscape feature
- Scree – Rock fragments weathered from larger mass
- Sea cave – Cave formed by the wave action of the sea
- Seamount – Mountain rising from the ocean seafloor that does not reach the water's surface
- Shield volcano – Low-profile volcano usually formed almost entirely of fluid lava flows
- Shoal – Natural submerged sandbank that rises from a body of water to near the surface
- Shore – Area where land meets the sea or ocean
- Shut-in – Type of rock formation found in Ozarks streams
- Side valley – Valley with a tributary to a larger river
- Sinkhole – Geologically-formed topological depression
- Skerry – Rocky island smaller than an islet
- Snowdrift – Snow deposit sculpted by wind into a mound during a snowstorm
- Sound – Long, wide body of water, connecting two larger bodies
- Spit – Coastal bar or beach landform deposited by longshore drift
- Spring – A point at which water emenges from an aquifer to the surface
- Stack – Geological landform consisting of a steep and often vertical column or columns of rock and stump
- Strait – Waterway connecting two bodies of water
- Strandflat – Type of landform found in high-latitude areas
- Strath – Large valley
- Stratovolcano – Type of conical volcano composed of layers of lava and tephra
- Stream pool – Deep and slow-moving stretch of a watercourse
- Stream – Body of surface water flowing down a channel
- Strike ridge – Ridge with a moderate sloping backslope and steeper frontslope
- Structural bench – Long, relatively narrow land bounded by distinctly steeper slopes above and below
- Structural terrace – Step-like landform
- Subglacial mound – Volcano formed when lava erupts beneath a thick glacier or ice sheet
- Submarine canyon – Steep-sided valley cut into the seabed of the continental slope
- Submarine volcano – Underwater vents or fissures in the Earth's surface from which magma can erupt
- Summit – Point on a surface with a higher elevation than all immediately adjacent points
- Supervolcano – Volcano that has erupted with a volcanic explosivity index of 8
- Surge channel – Type of coastal landform
- Swamp – Forested wetland
- Tepui – Table-top mountain or mesa in the Guiana Highlands of South America
- Terrace – Step-like landform
- Terracette – Small natural step-arranged soil ridges on hillsides
- Tessellated pavement – Flat rock surface subdivided by fractures
- Thalweg – Line of lowest points along a watercourse or valley
- Tidal island – Island accessible by foot at low tide
- Tidal marsh – Marsh subject to tidal change in water
- Tide pool – Rocky pool on a seashore, separated from the sea at low tide, filled with seawater
- Tied island – Island that is connected to land only by a tombolo
- Tombolo – Deposition landform in which an island is connected to the mainland by a sandy isthmus
- Tor – Large, free-standing rock outcrop on a gentle hill summit
- Tower karst – Topography from dissolved soluble rocks
- Towhead – Exposed landmass within a river
- Trim line – Clear line on the side of a valley marking the most recent highest extent of the glacier
- Triple junction – Meeting point of three tectonic plates
- Truncated spur – Ridge that descends towards a valley floor or coastline that is cut short
- Tukulan – Land forms in Yakutia, Russian Federation
- Tunnel valley – Glacial-formed geographic feature
- Turlough – Type of seasonal or periodic lake found in limestone areas of Ireland
- Tuya – Flat-topped, steep-sided volcano
- U-shaped valley – Valleys formed by glacial scouring
- Uvala – Toponym for a closed karst depression
- Vale – Low area between hills, often with a river running through it
- Valley – Low area between hills, often with a river running through it
- Valley shoulder – Low area between hills, often with a river running through it
- Ventifact – Rock that has been eroded by wind-driven sand or ice crystals
- Volcanic arc – Chain of volcanoes formed above a subducting plate
- Volcanic cone – Landform of ejecta from a volcanic vent piled up in a conical shape
- Volcanic crater – Roughly circular depression in the ground caused by volcanic activity
- Volcanic crater lake – Lake formed within a volcanic crater
- Volcanic dam – Natural dam produced directly or indirectly by volcanism
- Volcanic field – Area of Earth's crust prone to localized volcanic activity
- Volcanic group – Collection of related volcanoes or volcanic landforms
- Volcanic island – Island of volcanic origin
- Volcanic plateau – Plateau produced by volcanic activity
- Volcanic plug – Volcanic object created when magma hardens within a vent on an active volcano
- Volcanic vent – Rupture in a planet's crust where material escapes
- Volcano – Rupture in a planet's crust where material escapes
- Wadi – Hydrological feature
- Waterfall – Point in a river or brook where water flows over a vertical drop
- Watershed – Land area where water converges to a common outlet
- Wave-cut platform – Narrow flat area created by erosion
- Wetland – Ecosystem that is flooded or saturated with water
- Yardang – Streamlined aeolian landform

== See also ==
- Geomorphology – Scientific study of landforms
- Glossary of geology
- Types of bodies of water
- Volcanic landforms in the Canary Islands – list of examples in the Canary Islands (with photos)
