= Homocline (disambiguation) =

Homocline may refer to:

Geology

- Homocline, a type of geological structure

Geomorphology

- Homoclinal ridge, one of a number of topographic features (landforms) created by the erosion of tilted strata, i.e. a homocline

Mathematics

- Homoclinic orbit
- Homoclinic bifurcation
