= Moldavian Plateau =

Moldavian Plateau
Topography
Bukovinian Subcarpathians; Moldavian Subcarpathians Suceava Plateau; Dniester Hills; Moldavian Plain; Bârlad Plateau; Central Moldavian Plateau Bălți Steppe; Bugeac Steppe
Hydrography
Danube; Siret (Moldova, Suceava); Prut; Dniester (Răut); Black Sea
Climate
Romania; Moldova
Flora & Fauna
Flora of Romania; Flora of Moldova; List of mammals in Romania; List of mammals in Moldova; Protected areas in Romania; Protected areas in Moldova

The Moldavian Plateau (Romanian: Podișul Moldovei) is a geographic area of the historical region of Moldavia, spanning nowadays the east and northeast of Romania, most of Moldova (except the south), and most of the Chernivtsi Oblast of Ukraine (where it is known as the Pokuttian-Bessarabian Upland).

== Limits ==
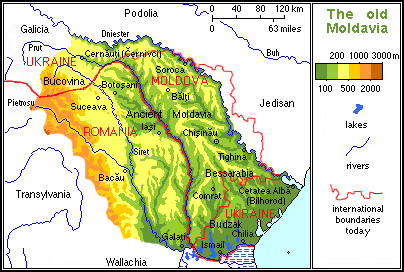
The old Principality of Moldavia comprised the entire Moldavian Plateau and some neighbouring geomorphological units such as the Moldavian-Muntenian Carpathians

The Moldavian Plateau is bounded (in clockwise order), as follows.

- To the west by the Eastern Carpathian Mountains (Romanian: Carpații Orientali).
- To north and north-east by the Podolian Plateau (Romanian: Podișul Podoliei).
- To the east and south east by Black Sea Lowland across which to the east stretches the Pontic Plain (Romanian: Câmpia Pontică), part of the Eurasian Steppe (Romanian: Stepa Eurasiatică) and to the south towards the Black Sea the Bugeac Plain (Romanian: Câmpia Bugeacului, Câmpia Moldovei de sud), comprising 3,210 km^{2} (1,240 sq mi) in Moldova.
- To the south by the Romanian Plain (also known as the Wallachian Plain) and the Bărăgan Plain (Romanian: Câmpia Română, Câmpia Bărăganului).
- To the southwest by the Vrancea Hills (Romanian: Dealurile Vrancei), part of the Sub Carpathians (also known as the Curvature Carpathians) (Romanian: Subcarpații de curbură).

The Moldavian Plateau comprises over two-thirds of the territory of the medieval Principality of Moldavia, with the Eastern Carpathian Mountains and the Bugeac Plain representing the remaining part. This fact is the origin of the name of the plateau. This geographic area (including Eastern Carpathians and the Bugeac) is also called (especially by historians) the Carpathian-Dniester-Pontic region, or the Carpathian-Dniester region, since it is bounded by the Carpathians to the west, by the river Dniester to the north and east, and by the Black Sea (Pontus Euxinus) and the Danube to the south-east and south.

== Genesis ==
The Moldavian Plateau was formed at the end of the Neogene through sediments, over an old continental platform, the East European Platform. Afterwards, the settled sediments, which were brought in by rivers from the Carpathian Mountains, were modeled by the elements giving the plateau its current aspect. The materials that formed the sediments are gravel and sand. Hardened, they formed gritstones. All over the plateau, the latter are interspersed with clays, or badlands, which produce landslides or other natural hazards.

The slope of the terrain follows the direction of the rivers: from northwest to southeast. Along them, the altitude decreases from 700 m (2,300 ft) to under 200 m (660 ft). The strata are disposed in North-South and northwest-southeast aligned layers, producing asymmetric valleys and ridges. Among the latter are the steep edge of the Bârlad Plateau (Romanian: Podișului Bârladului), known as the Iași Ridge (Romanian: Coasta Iașilor), the edge of the Central Moldavian Plateau (Romanian: Podișul Moldovei Centrale), known as the Cornești Hills, and the edge of the Dniester Hills, known as the Dniester Ridge.

The relief in the valleys of the rivers and creeks is quite conspicuous, so that the valleys have large terraces and hillocks. The Siret Passage (Romanian: Culoarul Siretului), ramified in the north with the Moldova Valley, and Suceava Valley cuts the main part of the plateau from the Moldavian Subcarpathians. The Prut Passage cuts the Plateau in half in the north-south direction. The Dniester Passage bounds it from the Podolian Plateau and the Pontic Plain. Its ramification Răut Passage separates the main part of the Moldavian Plateau from the Dniester Hills

== Composition ==
The Moldavian Plateau comprises several distinct regions:

- The Bukovinian Subcarpathians in the northwest.
- The Moldavian Subcarpathians in the west and southwest, has altitudes of up to 1,000 m (3,300 ft), but also includes depressions.
- The Suceava Plateau (Romanian: Podișul Sucevei), situated in the northwest, has altitudes that exceed 700 m (2,300 ft) and long ridges.
- The Dniester Hills (Romanian: Dealurile Nistrului), also known as Northern Moldavian Plateau (Podişul Moldovei de Nord), situated in the north and northeast, ridges along the Dniester River and has elevations of approximately 300 m (980 ft).
- The Moldavian Plain (Romanian: Câmpia Moldovei), in the center-north has elevations of approximately 200 m (660 ft):
  - The Jijia Plain, west of the river Prut.
  - The Middle Prut Valley, east of the river Prut, creeks tributary to the Prut, 2,930 square kilometres (1,131 sq mi).
  - The Bălți Steppe, east of the river Prut, creeks tributary to the Dniester, 1,920 square kilometres (741 sq mi).
- The Bârlad Plateau (Romanian: Podișul Bârladului), situated in the south-center occasionally has heights over 500 m (1,600 ft), but is generally sloped from north at 400 m (1,300 ft) to the south at 200 m (660 ft).
- The Central Moldavian Plateau (Romanian: Podișul Moldovei Centrale), situated in the center and southeast, has elevations that in the north-south direction decrease in altitude from 400 m (1,300 ft) to under 200 m (660 ft).
- The Bugeac Plain, the last continuation of the Pontic–Caspian steppe.

== Climate ==
The climate of this plateau is transitional Temperate Continental. Overall, the altitude affects the climate, with annual mean temperatures in the Suceava Plateau ranging between 6 °C (43 °F) and 8 °C (46 °F) and precipitation of 500 millimetres (19.7 in) to 800 millimetres (31.5 in) per year and, with annual mean temperatures of 8 °C (46 °F) to 10 °C (50 °F) and precipitation of 400 millimetres (15.7 in) to 500 millimetres (19.7 in) in the Moldavian Plain or Bârlad Plateau.

The main influence on the climate is Dry Continental with frequent cold north winds in winter. In the Suceava Plateau and the Dniester Hills, there is an influence of Scandinavo–Baltic climate with the circulation of masses of polar air in the winter.

== Waters ==
Streams on the plateau flow into the Siret, Prut, or Dniester rivers. The Prut has the Jijia as its principal tributary. The Siret traverses and—with the exception of the Subcarpathians—limits the Moldavian Plateau

The lack of precipitation has required water management in the Jijia Plain and in the Bălți steppe which serves as a reservoir and for fish farming; Lake Dracșani is the largest of these. Other bodies of water are the rivers Siret and Prut (Lake Stânca-Costești, Lake Dubăsari), in the Siret Passage.

== Natural resources ==
The Moldavian Plateau holds hydrocarbon resources (petroleum and the associated gases), which are extracted in the southwest portion. In the northwest are found Romania's most important reserves of kaolin (china clay), extracted and used to produce porcelain.

Hemp is cultivated in the Suceava Plateau, cereals and wine grapes (Vitis vinifera) in the Jijia Plain, Bălți Steppe, Bârlad Plateau, and the Central Moldavian Plateau. In the Siret Passage they cultivate potatoes and sugar beets.

== Fauna ==
Characteristic of the plateau are mammals such as goats, wild boars, wolves, foxes, European wildcats, lynxes, badgers, and hares. Birds include black grouse, woodpeckers, cuckoos, pheasants, quails, hawks, owls, and fish include perch and the carp-like barbel.
