= Niveo-aeolian deposition =

Deposition of sediments onto snow or ice

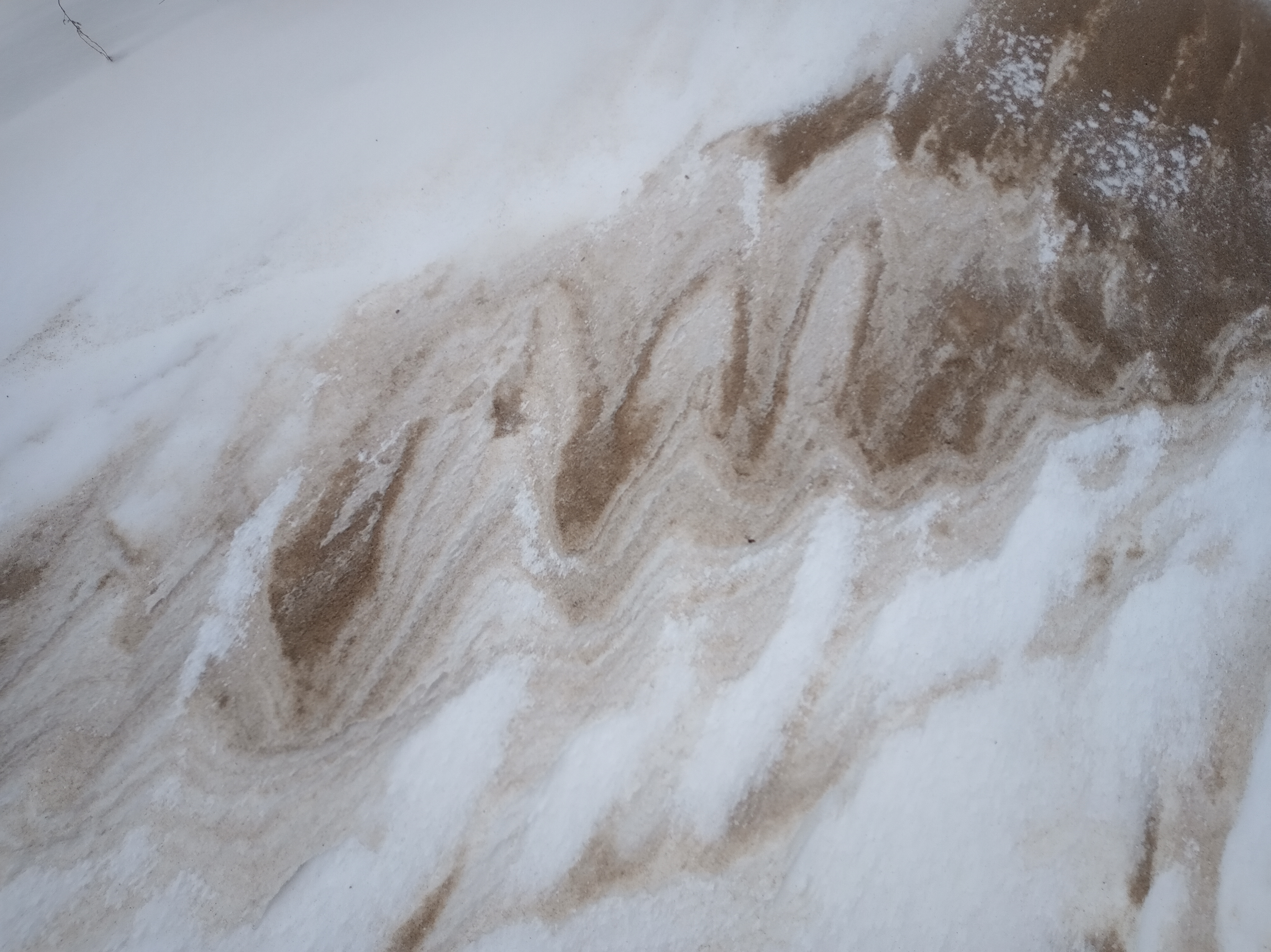
Layers of sand and snow deposited by wind on a beach of Lake Michigan

Niveo-aeolian or cryo-aeolian deposition is the process by which fine-grained sediments are transported by wind and deposited on or mixed with snow or ice. The wind sweeps the snow and sand grains into aeolian landforms such as ripples, and further sorts the snow and ice grains into distinct layers. When snow melts or sublimates, the sediments are redeposited onto the surface below., forming patterns known as denivation features.

Niveo-aeolian deposition is most widespread in polar climates, but may be found anywhere that is at least seasonally below freezing. In most places, much or all of the snow in these niveo-aeolian deposits melts in the spring or summer. However, "perennial" niveo-aeolian deposits have been observed in Antarctica's Victoria Valley.

Initially, after the wind has deposited it, the surface of a niveo-aeolian deposit typically consists of a rippled bedform of mixed sand and snow. Beneath the surface, the deposits commonly consist of alternating layers of snow and sediment. These layers may be up to 60 centimetres (24 in) thick. However, sometimes the sediment and snow are intermingled without distinct layers.

Niveo-aeolian deposition plays an important role in soil transport in cold climates, such as the formation of loess soils in Alaska through the deposition of windblown silt. Further south, in coastal landscapes of the Laurentian Great Lakes, niveo-aeolian deposition facilitates the transport of sand into lakes and marshes, thus enhancing the sand signal. The prolonged denivation process also creates a source of fresh water, in the otherwise extremely dry dune and beach environment, for months after all surface snow has melted.

Cryo-aeolian deposition has been proposed as one explanation for certain landforms on the planet Mars. In particular, denivation has been suggested as a cause of apparent meltwater fans in Kaiser Crater. Proposed terrestrial analogs for these Martian landscapes include the Victoria Valley in Antarctica and the Great Kobuk Sand Dunes in Alaska.

== Denivation ==
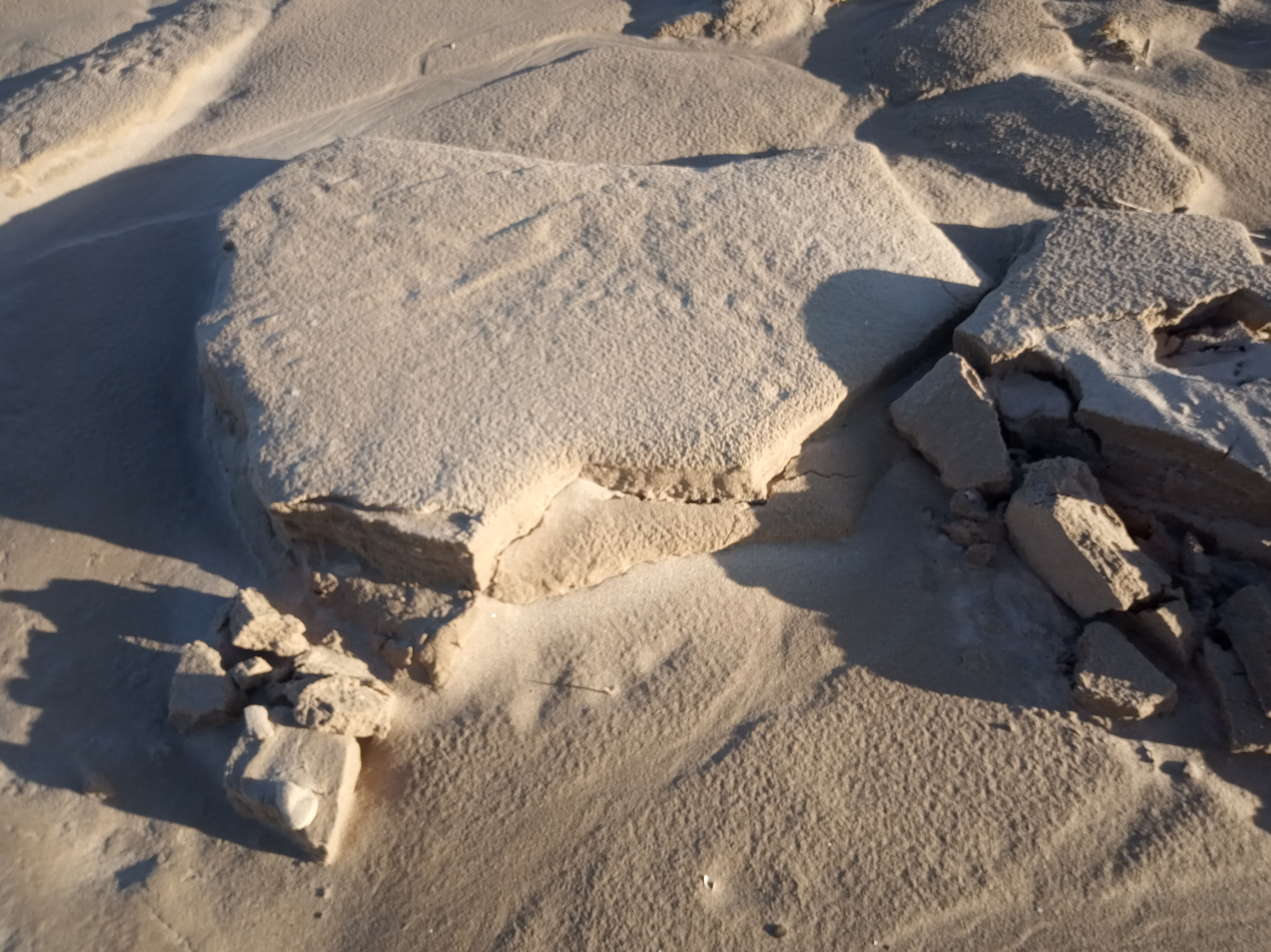
A sand-covered section of Lake Michigan shelf ice, showing stress cracks and meltwater fan from denivation

During denivation, any outer snow melts first, so that the outer surface of the remaining niveo-aeolian deposit consists of sand. This surface sand exhibits tensional surface cracks due to the continued melting of the underlying snow.

Denivation features may take several forms, including "snow ramparts" formed by slumping down a dune or hill slope, thermokarstic sinkholes caused by melting below the surface, hummocks caused by sediment draped over the remaining ice, spongy surfaces caused by the collapse of the sand and snow layers, and debris flows caused by meltwater. Smaller features include pellets, cracks, and dimples.

Denivation features typically disrupt aeolian patterns only temporarily. After all the snow or ice has melted or sublimated, continued wind action gradually destroys them.

== See also ==
- Dirt cone
- Palsa
- Snowdrift

== Works cited ==
- French, Hugh M. (2007). The Periglacial Environment (3rd ed.). John Wiley & Sons Ltd. ISBN 978-0-470-86588-0.
- Hooper, Donald M.; Horgan, Briony (2014). "Denivation Features". Encyclopedia of Planetary Landforms. pp. 1–8. doi:10.1007/978-1-4614-9213-9_458-1. ISBN 978-1-4614-9213-9.
- Kochanski, K.; Anderson, R.S. (2019). "The evolution of snow bedforms in the Colorado Front Range and the processes that form them". The Cryosphere. 13: 1267–1281. doi:10.5194/tc-13-1267-2019.
- Hugenholtz, Chris H.; Hooper, Donald M. (2014). "Niveo-Aeolian Deposits". Encyclopedia of Planetary Landforms. pp. 1–7. doi:10.1007/978-1-4614-9213-9_516-1. ISBN 978-1-4614-9213-9.
- Pye, Kenneth; Tsoar, Haim (2008). Aeolian Sand and Sand Dunes. Springer Science & Business Media. ISBN 9783540859109.
- Seppälä, Matti (2004). Wind as a Geomorphic Agent in Cold Climates. Cambridge University Press. ISBN 9780521564069.
- van Dijk, D. (2014). "Short- and long-term perspectives on the evolution of a Lake Michigan foredune". In Fisher, Timothy G.; Hansen, Edward C. (eds.). Coastline and Dune Evolution along the Great Lakes. Geological Society of America. pp. 195–216. ISBN 9780813725086.
