= Homocline =

Geological structure in which rock strata dip uniformly in a single direction

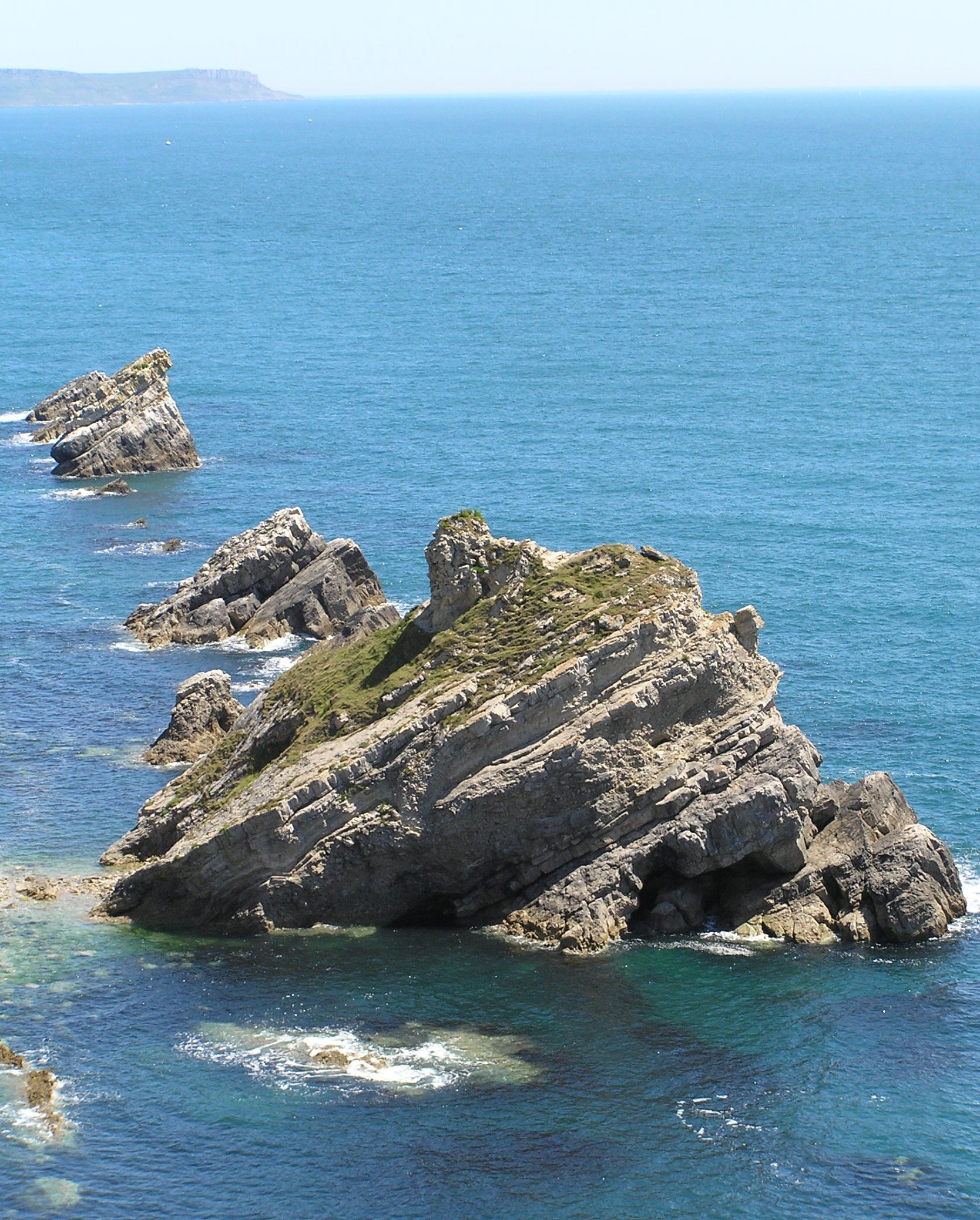
Homocline near Lulworth Cove, England

Diagram of a homocline

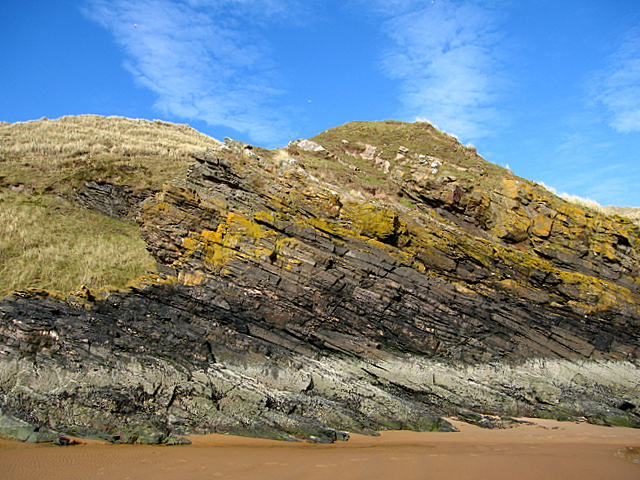
Homocline in Aberdeenshire, Scotland

In structural geology, a homocline or homoclinal structure (from old Greek: homo = same, cline = inclination), is a geological structure in which the layers of a sequence of rock strata, either sedimentary or igneous, dip uniformly in a single direction having the same general inclination in terms of direction and angle. A homocline can be associated with either one limb of a fold, the edges of a dome, the coast-ward tilted strata underlying a coastal plain, slice of thrust fault, or a tilted fault block. When the homoclinal strata consists of alternating layers of rock that vary hardness and resistance to erosion, their erosion produces either cuestas, homoclinal ridges, or hogbacks depending on the angle of dip of the strata. On a topographic map, the landfroms associated with homoclines exhibit nearly parallel elevation contour lines that show a steady change in elevation in a given direction. In the subsurface, they characterize by parallel structural contour lines.

Unicline and Uniclinal are obsolete and currently uncommon terms that are defined and have been used by geologists and geomorphologists in an inconsistent and contradictory manner. They are terms that have been used in a mutually exclusive manner as a synonym for either a homocline or monocline depending the author. The meaning of this term has been further confused by Grabau, who redefined uniclinal, not as a geological structure, but as a general term for ridges produced by erosion of anticlines.

The erosion of tilted sequences of either stratified sedimentary or igneous rock, homoclines, of alternating resistance to erosion produce distinctive landforms that form a gradational continuum from cuestas through homoclinal ridges to hogbacks. Less resistant beds are preferentially eroded creating valleys that lie between ridges created by the erosion of more resistant beds. For example, the erosion of homoclines consisting of resistant beds of either limestone, sandstone, or both interbedded with weaker, less resistant beds of either shale, siltstone, marl, or combination of them will produce either cuestas, homoclinal ridges, or hogbacks depending on the angle of dip of the strata. The greater the difference in the resistance to erosion, the more pronounced the structural control and relief between valley and ridge crest.

== Etymology ==
According to Whitney in 1890 and Kelley in 1955, Charles Darwin used the term uniclinal prior to 1843 to describe to strata dipping uniformly in one direction. Later in 1843, Rogers and Rogers created the term monocline and used it to describe beds dipping uniformly in one direction within the Appalachian Mountains. However, starting with Powell in 1873, geologists also used monocline to specifically describe a step-like fold in otherwise uniformly dipping strata while other geologists still used it to describe beds dipping uniformly in one direction. Thus, the term monocline was used to describe both beds dipping in one direction and a one-limbed flexure with different authors making incompatible distinctions between them. Because of this confused usage of monocline, Daly formally introduced the term homocline and in 1915 and 1916 defined it in its current usage and redefined monocline as a one-limbed flexure as it is currently used.
