= Crary Fan =

Undersea fan in the Weddell Sea

Crary Fan (74°S 33°W) is a fan named for A.P. Crary, an American geophysicist. The name was proposed by Dr. Heinrich Hinze of the Alfred Wegener Institute for Polar and Marine Research, Bremerhaven, Germany, and approved by the Advisory Committee for Undersea Features in June 1997.
