= Médanos (geology) =

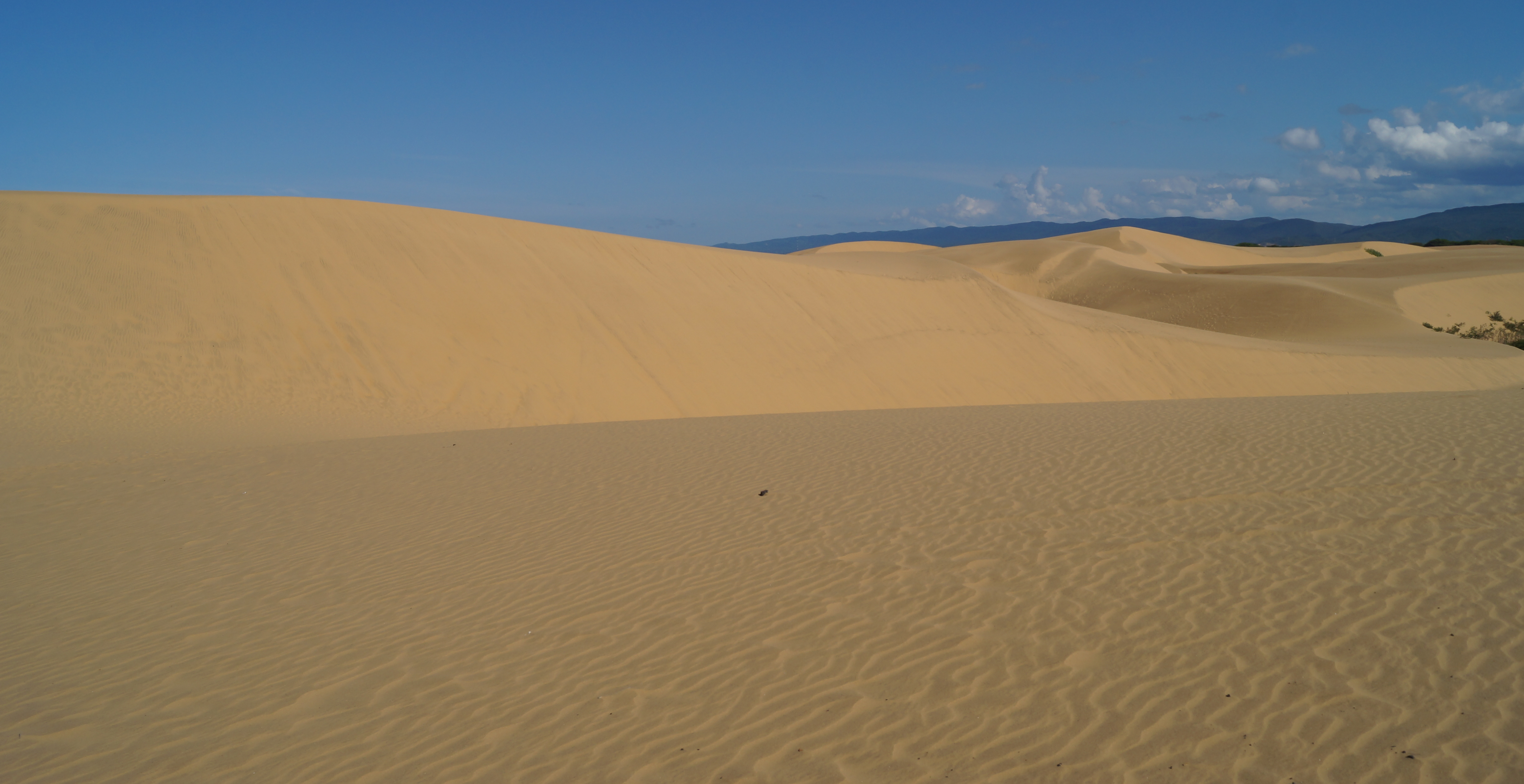
Unvegetated Médanos de Coro in Estado Falcón, Venezuela

Vegetated médanos from Mendoza Province, Argentina (Médanos de Los Naranjos near San Rafael)

In South America, the word médanos refers to continental dunes whereas dunas refers to dunes of coastal origin. Médanos may be vegetated or unvegetated. For example, the médanos of La Pampa Province in Argentina are mostly vegetated dunes with occasional blowouts. On the other hand, the dunes of Médanos de Coro National Park in Venezuela are mostly unvegetated. An early description of unvegetated médanos in Peru is provided by the Swiss naturalist and explorer Johann Jakob von Tschudi (1847):

"The médanos are hillock-like elevations of sand, some having a firm, others a loose base. The former, which are always crescent-shaped, are from ten to twenty feet high, and have an acute crest. The inner side is perpendicular, and the outer or bow side forms an angle with a steep inclination downward. When driven by violent winds, the médanos pass rapidly over the plains. The smaller and lighter ones move quickly forwards before the larger ones; but the latter soon overtake and crush them, whilst they are themselves shivered by the collision. These medanos assume all sorts of extraordinary figures, and sometimes move along the plain in rows forming most intricate labyrinths, whereby what might otherwise be visible in the distance is withdrawn from the view of the traveller. A plain often appears to be covered with a row of médanos, and some days afterwards it is again restored to its level and uniform aspect. Persons who have the greatest experience of the coast are apt to mistake their way, when they encounter these sandhills."

== See also ==
- Aeolian processes
- Barchan

== Bibliography ==
- Albert, F. 1900. Las dunas, o sean las arenas volantes, voladeras, arenas muertas, invasión de las arenas, playas y médanos del centro de Chile: comprendiendo el litoral desde el límite norte de la provincia de Aconcagua hasta el límite sur de la de Arauco. Anales de la Universidad, Santiago de Chile: Imprenta Cervantes, 288 pp.
- Bovet, P.A. 1910. El problema de los médanos en el país (con especial referencia a los del sur de Córdoba y San Luís). Buenos Aires: Talleres heliográficos de Ortega e Radaelli, 52 pp.
- Bovet, P.A. 1912. Cómo encarar nuestro problema de los médanos: trabajo presentado al Congreso forestal y frutal de la provincia de Buenos Aires (noviembre de 1911). La Plata: Taller de Impressiones Oficiales, 31 pp.
- Girola, C. 1919. Fijación de médanos. In: Primer Congreso de Agricultura de Córdoba. Anales de la Sociedad Rural Argentina, Buenos Aires, pp. 205–207.
- Goddard, D. and Picard, Y.X. 1973. Los médanos de Coro: composición, granulometría y migración de las arenas. Caracas: Ministerio de Energía y Minas, Venezuela, División de Geología Marina, 13 pp.
- Hernández Baño, A. and Trujillo, M.T. 1986. Secretos de los Médanos de Coro. Serie Historia regional no. 1, Coro: Instituto de Cultura del Estado Falcón, Instituto Nacional de Parques, Caracas, 92 pp.
- Hernández-Pacheco, F. 1946. Fases de formación de los médanos en las playas de Cabo Juby. Boletín de la Real Sociedad Española de Historia Natural 44(3–4):239-242.
- Morales, P.R. 1979. Estudio de los médanos de Venezuela: evidencias de un clima desértico. Acta Biológica de Venezuela 10:19-49.
- Prego, A.J. 1953–54. Fijación de médanos. Almanaque del Ministerio de Agricultura y Ganadería 28–29, pp. 305–311.
- Prego, A.J. and Prohaska, F.J. 1960. Dinámica de los médanos en la región pampeana semiárida. IDIA, Suplemento 1, Instituto Nacional de Tecnología Agropecuaria (INTA), Buenos Aires, 30–33.
- Prego, A.J. 1960. Fijación de médanos. Publicación del Instituto Nacional de Tecnología Agropecuaria (INTA), Buenos Aires.
- Prego, A.J. 1964. Forestación de médanos en la región pampeana semiárida: primera contribución. Buenos Aires: Republica Argentina, Secretaria de Estado de Agricultura y Ganadería de la Nación, Instituto Nacional de Tecnología Agropecuaria (INTA), Centro Nacional de Investigaciones Agropecuarias, Instituto de Suelos y Agrotecnia, Publicación (Instituto de Suelos y Agrotecnia, Argentina), no. 92, pp. 73–82.
- Prego, A.J., et al. 1965. Estabilización de médanos mediante forestación en la región pampeana semiárida. Segunda contribución. IDIA, Suplemento 16, Instituto Nacional de Tecnología Agropecuaria (INTA), Buenos Aires, pp. 75–92.
- Prego, A.J., et al. 1966. Estabilización de médanos mediante forestación en la región Pampeana. Buenos Aires: Instituto de Suelos y Agrotecnica, Publicación 100, 17 pp.
- Prego, A.J., et al. 1967. Estabilización de médanos mediante forestación en la región pampeana semiárida. IDIA, Suplemento 19, Instituto Nacional de Tecnología Agropecuaria (INTA); Buenos Aires, pp. 41–43.
- Roa-Morales, P. 1973. Génesis de los médanos de los Llanos de Venezuela. Universidad de Zulia, Maracaibo, 4 pp.
- Rosetto, H.E. 1953. Contribución al conocimiento psamográfico de los médanos de la zona oriental del partido de Villarino (provincia de Buenos Aires). Doctoral thesis, Universidad Nacional de La Plata, Ciencias Naturales y Museo, 104 pp.
- Talarico, L.A. and Ferreiro, A.C. 1953. Evolución de los materiales que componen los médanos. IDIA (Diciembre):1-4.
- Tripaldi, A. 2002. Sedimentología y evolución del campo de dunas de Médanos Grandes (provincia de San Juan, Argentina) (Sedimentology and evolution of Médanos Grandes dunefield, San Juan province, Argentina). AAS Revista (Asociación Argentina de Sedimentología) 9(1):65-82.
- Tripaldi, A. and Forman, S.L. 2007. Geomorphology and chronology of Late Quaternary dune fields of western Argentina. Palaeogeography, Palaeoclimatology, Palaeoecology 251(2):300-320.
- Strassburger, R. 1959. Praderización de médanos mediante el empleo de aglunante asfáltico. Manual de Asfálticos. Comunicación Petrolíferos Fiscales, Buenos Aires, 9 pp.
- Tricart, J. 1976. Existencia de médanos cuaternarios en los Llanos del Orinoco. Colombia Geográfica 5(1):69-79.
- Vidal, J.J. 1948. Dunas y médanos: consolidación, aprovechamiento como terrenos forestales, protección de suelos arenosos contra la deflación. La Plata, 205 pp.
