= Truncated spur =

Ridge that descends towards a valley floor or coastline that is cut short

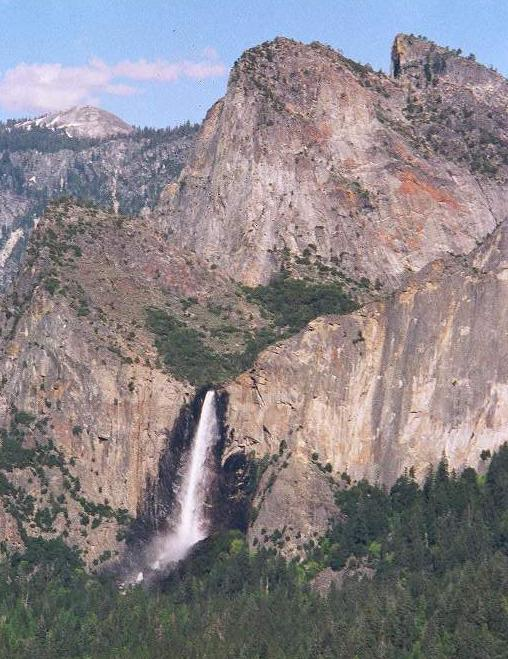
Bridal Veil Falls in Yosemite National Park. Either side of the waterfall are the flat vertical faces of the truncated spurs

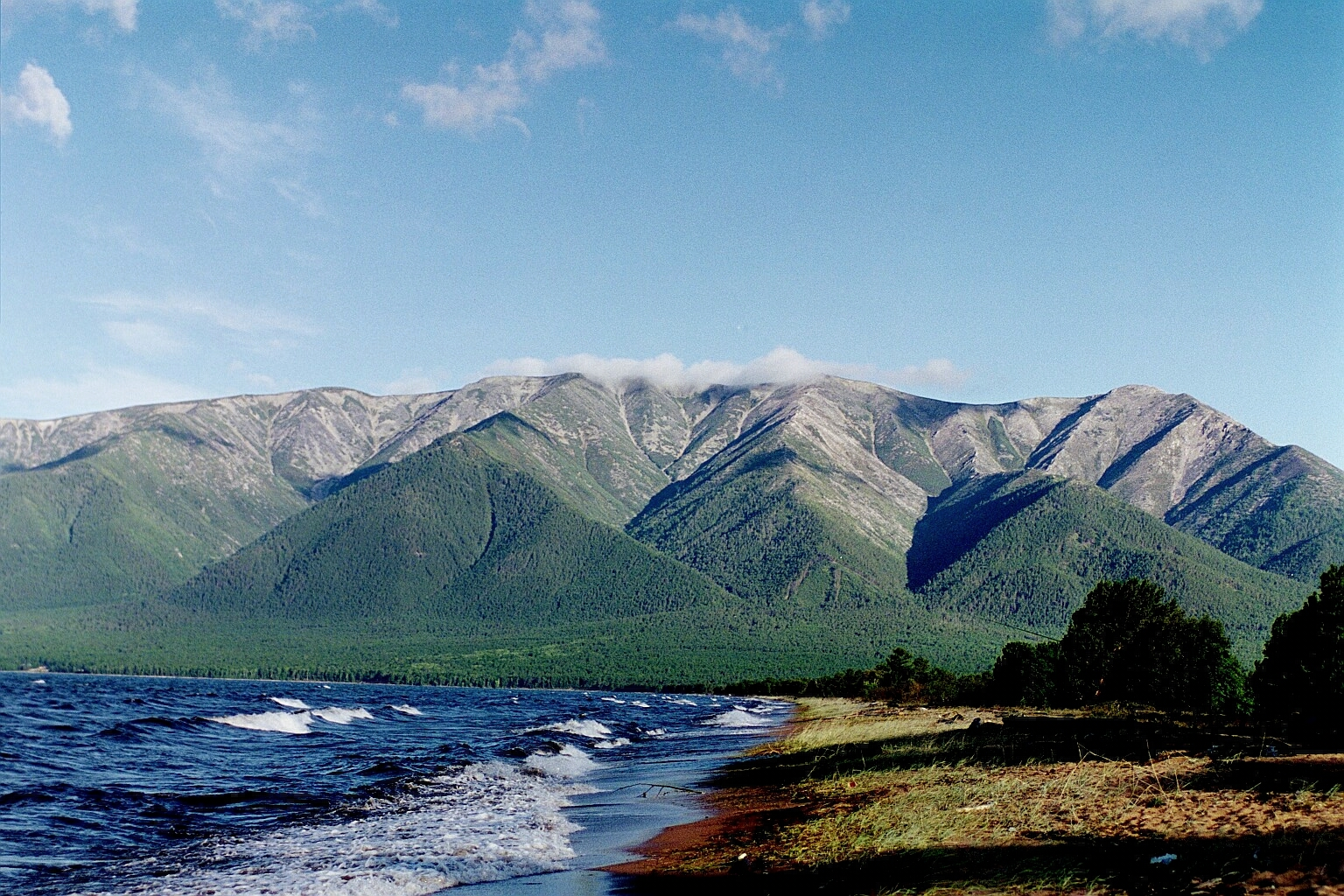
Faulted southeastern side of Svyatoy Nos peninsula, Lake Baikal - active faulting shown by faceted spurs forming triangular facets

A truncated spur is a spur, which is a ridge that descends towards a valley floor or coastline from a higher elevation, that ends in an inverted-V face and was produced by the erosional truncation of the spur by the action of either streams, waves, or glaciers. Truncated spurs can be found within mountain ranges, along the walls of river valleys, or along coastlines.

A faceted spur is also a spur that ends in a triangular face, known as a triangular facet, with a broad base and an apex pointing upward. As typically used in geology, the triangular facet is usually a remnant of a fault plane and it and its associated faceted spur are the result of faulting. The term faceted spur is also applied to inverted-V rock faces formed by stream, wave, or glacial erosion and, thus, as a synonym for truncated spur.

== Formation ==
=== Truncated spurs ===
Before glaciation, relatively immature rivers display a pattern of interlocking spurs. A valley glacier cannot avoid the interlocking spurs as a river can. As the valley glacier moves, abrasion and plucking erode the protruding tips of the spurs, leaving steep cliff-like truncated spurs. Hanging valleys are found in between truncated spurs as they join the main glacial valley from the side. It is common for waterfalls to form from them, where they fall into the main valley. Such truncated spurs can be found in mountainous regions. The Mer de Glace, in the European Alps, is a valley through which a glacier currently flows. This is a geologically active process where the glacier continues to gradually erode the valley sides.

=== Faceted spurs ===
In the most typical usage of this term, faceted spurs are formed by active faulting, especially normal faulting that produces well-defined triangular facets along either a mountain front or edges of a rift valley. These triangular facets provide evidence for recent fault movement and are used in seismotectonic analysis. Classic examples of faceted spurs can be found all along the Central Wasatch Fault, north-central Utah.
