= Terracette =

Small natural step-arranged soil ridges on hillsides

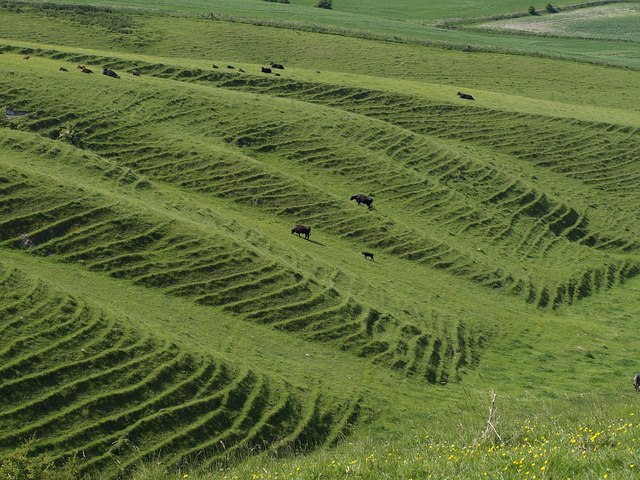
Terracettes in Wiltshire, England

A terracette is a landform consisting of a hillside ridge arranged as part of sub-parallel "step-like sequences" of such ridges. Terracette occur on steep hillsides and are regularly spaced. Various causes have been suggested to explain their origin including: animal trampling, vegetation and regolith behaviour, soil creep and solifluction including gelifluction.

One explanation holds that terracettes are formed when saturated soil particles expand, then contract as they dry, causing them to move slowly downhill. An example of this is the manger near the Uffington White Horse. It may also be described as a small, irregular step-like formation on steep hillslopes, especially on those used for pasture which are formed by soil creep or erosion of surface soils exacerbated by the trampling of livestock such as sheep or cattle. Synonyms are: catstep, cattle terracing, sheep or cattle track.

Early investigators such as C. Darwin (1904) believed that animals grazing the hillsides caused terracettes, but further examination revealed places where they abruptly end at steep rock faces or at soils of different composition. Other sites show livestock trails cutting across terracettes. Geomorphologists Vincent and Clarke have also cast doubt about the ability of animals alone to create such regular steps or ridges.

== See also ==
- Downland
