= Lavaka =

Type of gully, formed via groundwater sapping

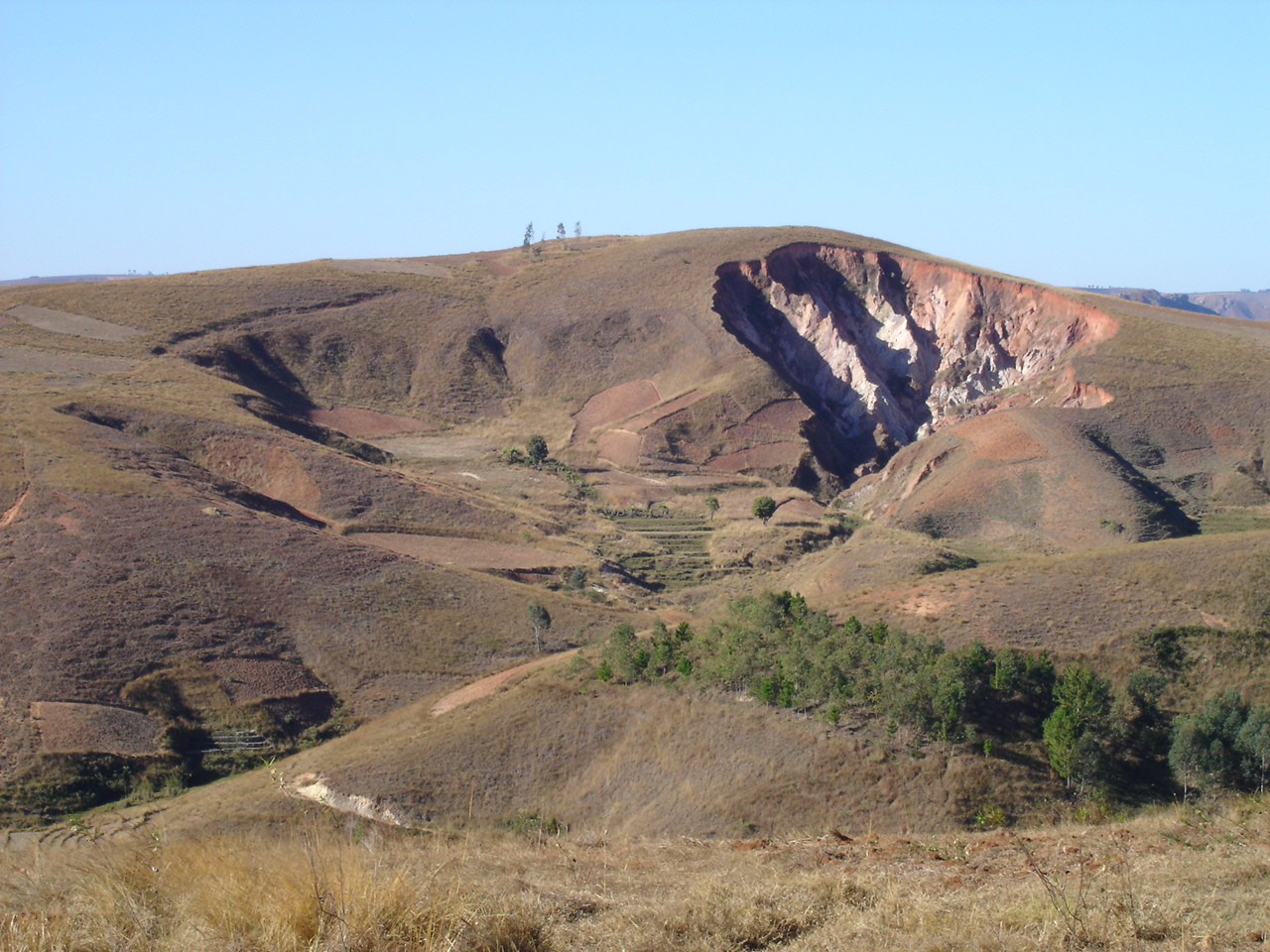
Active lavaka on right, with inactive, largely infilled older lavakas to left

Lavaka (Malagasy pronunciation: [ˈlavakə̥]), the Malagasy word for "hole", usually found on the side of a hill, is a type of erosional feature common in Madagascar. However, Lavaka have also been found in South Africa, the Democratic Republic of the Congo, and South Carolina, and similar landforms have been found in Brazil, the Great Plains of the United States, and Eswatini. They are most common in tropical regions between the Cancer and Capricorn latitudes, especially the Central Highlands of Madagascar, where approximately one metre thick laterites develop on steep terrains in a monsoonal climate. Lavaka form where these hard laterites overlie thick (tens of metres) saprolite, on steep (35 to 55 degree) slopes, in areas that have a hot dry season and a warm wet season.

Lavaka are not landslides. They are a type of gully, formed via groundwater sapping. They are usually shaped like a tear-drop with a steep, round headwall that narrows downhill into a shallow outlet channel.

Although human activities—such as deforestation, overgrazing, road creation, and grassland burning—can contribute to lavaka formation, lavakas can also develop by purely natural processes. Work by Neil Wells and colleagues showed that air photos reveal remnants of ancient lavakas in recently deforested areas, showing that those areas were eroded by lavakas before the rain forests grew; and radiocarbon dating indicates that some lavakas are up to 20,000 years old, meaning they were present in the Malagasy landscape before the arrival of humans (human arrival in Madagascar is less than 2000 years before present).

Among the natural controls on Lavaka formation are the amount of seismic activity in the region, the topographic relief (or slope), and hydraulic conductivity of materials in the saprolite. For instance, earthquakes in the region can cause cracks in the hard, upper layer of laterite, which allows water to seep into the more porous layer of saprolite underneath. This causes chemical reactions within the saprolite to leach certain minerals from the rock and if the hydraulic conductivity of that rock is high enough, the water can carry those minerals away, which can cause the infrastructure of that rock to collapse and erode.

Lavaka can often cause a lot of damage to nearby communities. During the monsoon season, heavy rains carry away all the eroded material from the lavaka, which can destroy surrounding crops and infrastructure. This is the basis for much of the recent research that has been conducted on the variables involved in lavaka formation (especially in Madagascar, where Lavaka pepper the Central Highland landscape).

However, lavaka also have some benefits. They provided a sheltered environment for trees and other plants that would not survive on the grassy slopes, and in many cases farmers take advantage of more fertile soils and greater water availability within lavaka to grow crops.

The term "Lavaka" entered the international geography/geology vocabulary following the work of Riquier (1954). To differentiate it from the generic hole vocabulary (aka, trou, in French, and lavaka in Malagasy), this new vocabulary should be capitalized in scientific usage. More importantly, since the word has been taken directly from the vernacular name, it should be considered as an irregular word. Thus, Lavaka can be singular or plural when used.
