= Kurum (landform) =

Mantle of loose rocks moving by creeping on gentle slopes

A kurum is a landform made up of a mantle of loose blocks of rock moving downslope by creep in cold climates. Kurums differs from other similar landforms in that they form on slopes of lesser angle than natural debris slopes. Relict kurums formed during the Quaternary have been reported in western Europe including the Black Forest and the Ardennes. Active kurums exists in Siberia.
