= Kame delta =

Glacial melt water landform

A kame delta (or ice-contact delta, morainic delta) is a glacial landform formed by a stream of melt water flowing through or around a glacier and depositing material, known as kame (stratified sequence of sediments) deposits. Upon entering a proglacial lake at the end (terminus) of a glacier, the river/stream deposit these sediments. This landform can be observed after the glacier has melted and the delta's asymmetrical triangular shape is visible. Once the glacier melts, the edges of the delta may subside as ice under it melts. Glacial till is deposited on the lateral sides of the delta, as the glacier melts.

== Associations ==
Kame deltas form in association with other glacial features such as kettles and eskers. Kettle lakes can form in between kame deltas. Eskers are remnants of old stream sediment flows that are exposed after the glacier has melted. These formations give indication that kame deltas formed during times of glaciation.

== Formation ==
As a river or stream empties into a proglacial lake, sediments of silt, sand, and gravel are deposited into the lake. Since these sediments are stream deposited, the stratigraphy of the beds will be well sorted. In these bed layers, sharp distinct size variations may occur in the clast size. This indicates a quick change in the river or stream's velocity. Over time, depending on how deep the proglacial lake was and if the stream melt water was a constant, these sediments would build up and out of the lake. Sediments will then begin depositing against the terminus, or toe, of the glacier. This type of formation causes the asymmetrical triangular shaped mound, with a flat top. The longer side of the triangle, is the side that slopes down into the proglacial lake. The steeper side is the one that was up against the terminus. As the glacier retreats and the ice under the delta melts, the edges of the glacier will drop, causing a fault line to be visible on the side of the kame delta.

== Locations ==
The Fonthill Kame Delta is the highest point in the Niagara Peninsula region.

Tree River, in Nunavut, Canada.

Glacial Park, Ringwood, Illinois.

Chenango River, New York.

Springdale, Newfoundland and Labrador

== See also ==
- River delta
