= Nubbin (landform) =

Small hill of bedrock with rounded residual blocks

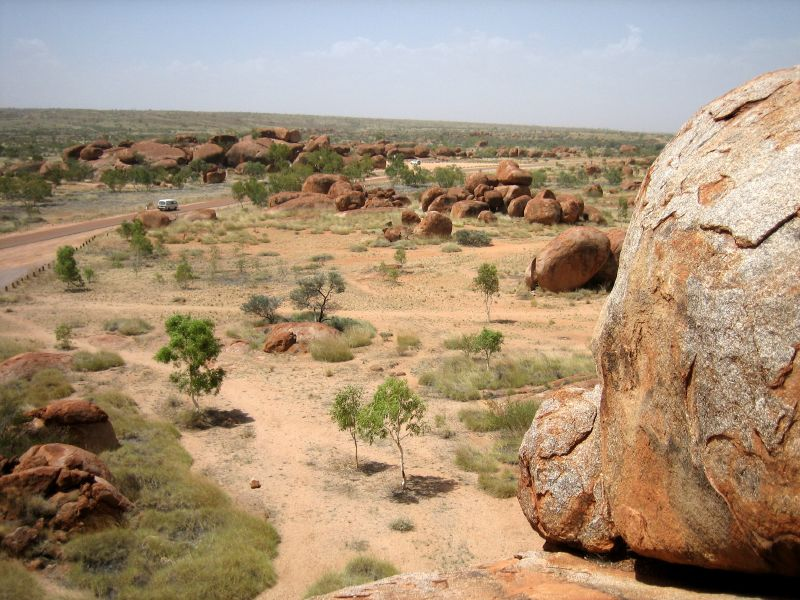
Nubbins of Karlu Karlu / Devils Marbles Conservation Reserve, Central Australia

In geomorphology a nubbin is a small and gentle hill consisting of a bedrock core dotted with rounded residual blocks. The blocks derive from disintegrated and weathered bedrock layers. In particular it is assumed that the boulders of the nubbins are the remnants of the outer one or two exfoliation shells that weathered underground - albeit some weathering can continue to occur once the boulders are exposed on surface.

Nubbins form in a similar way to castle koppies and bornhardts, and the three landforms can be seen as different expressions of the same phenomena. Nubbins occur often in patterned groups.

Nubbins can be found in humid tropical- and monsoon-climate areas. According to geomorphologist C. R. Twidale this is the environment where most nubbins form. Nubbins outside the humid or seasonally-humid tropics are relict landforms formed in a humid and tropical past or form in areas of high subsurface humidity. Examples of localities with nubbins include the Southwestern United States, the MacDonnell Ranges in Central Australia and Namaqualand in Southern Africa.

While nubbins are typically made up of granite there have also been reports of nubbins made of ignimbrite.

== See also ==
- Grus (geology) – Sand and gravel fragments accumulation
- Inselberg – Isolated, steep rock hill on relatively flat terrain
- Saprolite – Chemically weathered rock
