= Exhumed river channel =

Ridge of sandstone that remains when the softer flood plain mudstone is eroded away

An exhumed river channel is a ridge of sandstone that remains when the softer flood plain mudstone is eroded away. The process begins with the deposition of sand within a river channel (typically a meandering river) and mud on the adjacent floodplain. Eventually the channel is abandoned and over time becomes buried by flood deposits from other channels. Because the sand is porous (grain-to-grain contact leaves spaces between), groundwater flows more easily through the sand than through the mud of the floodplain deposits.

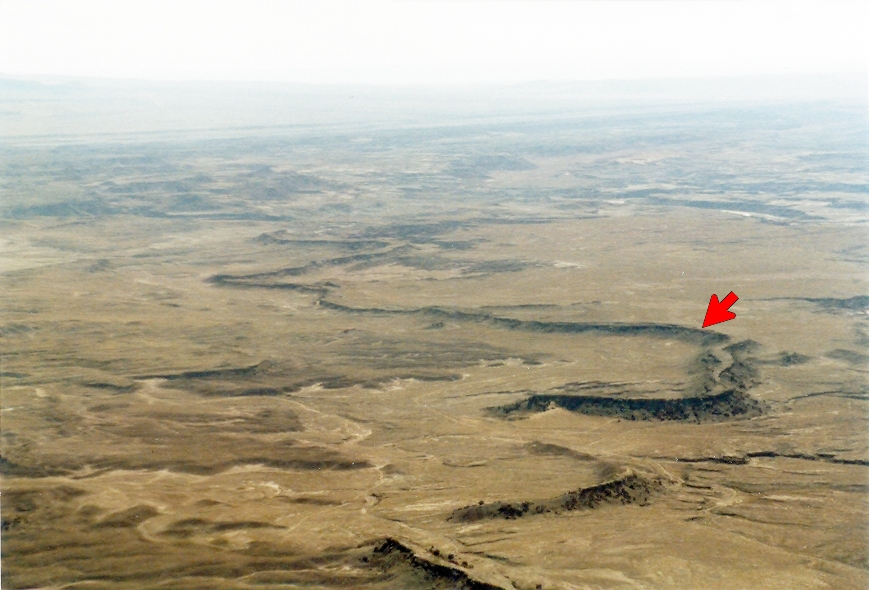
An exhumed river channel (red arrow) in the Cedar Mountain Formation near Green River, Utah

Minerals (typically calcium carbonate) can cement the grains together converting the loose sand into sandstone. Meanwhile, pressure from overlying sediments compresses the floodplain mud converting it to mudstone. Millions of years later, erosion can remove the softer, less cemented mudstone and leave the more resistant sandstone as a sinuous ridge. Thus, an exhumed river channel is a form of inverted relief: what was previously low is now high, and vice versa. Exhumed channels are important indicators for ancient stream flow direction.

Some of the best examples of exhumed river channels occur in the Ruby Ranch Member of the Cretaceous Cedar Mountain Formation southwest of Green River, Utah. Within the Cedar Mountain Formation in this part of Utah, fluvial sandstones filling paleochannels within it are cemented by calcium carbonate. Because of this cementation, the sandstone filling these paleochannels are considerably more resistant to erosion than the shale and mudstone that enclose them. As a result, differential erosion preferentially removes the shale and mudstone and exposes these paleochannels as ridges.

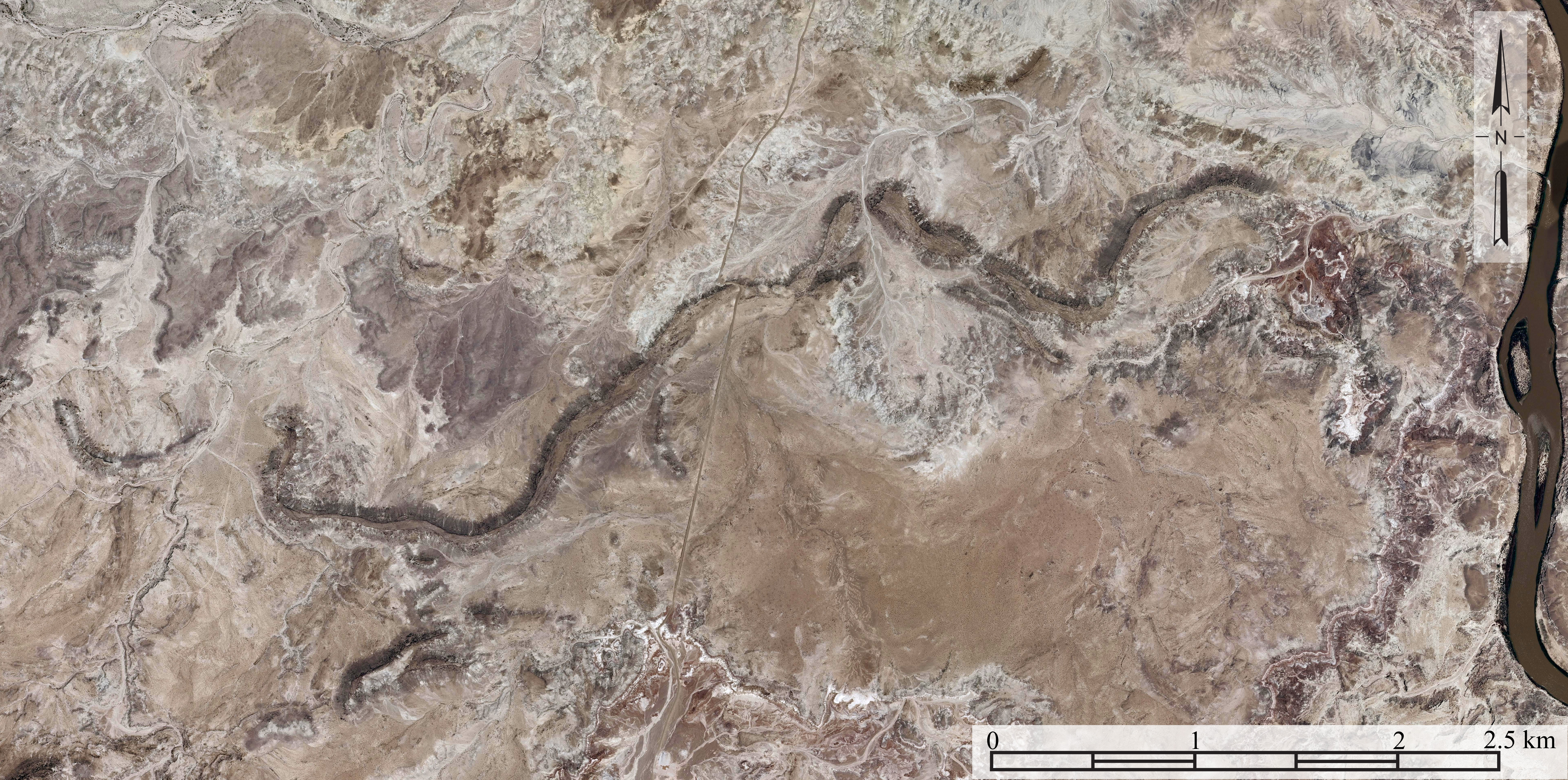
Aerial view of exhumed river channel near Green River, Emery County, Utah (38° 52’ 23.35”, -110° 13’ 2.63”)

== See also ==
Inverted relief
