= Sastrugi =

Sharp irregular grooves or ridges formed on a snow surface

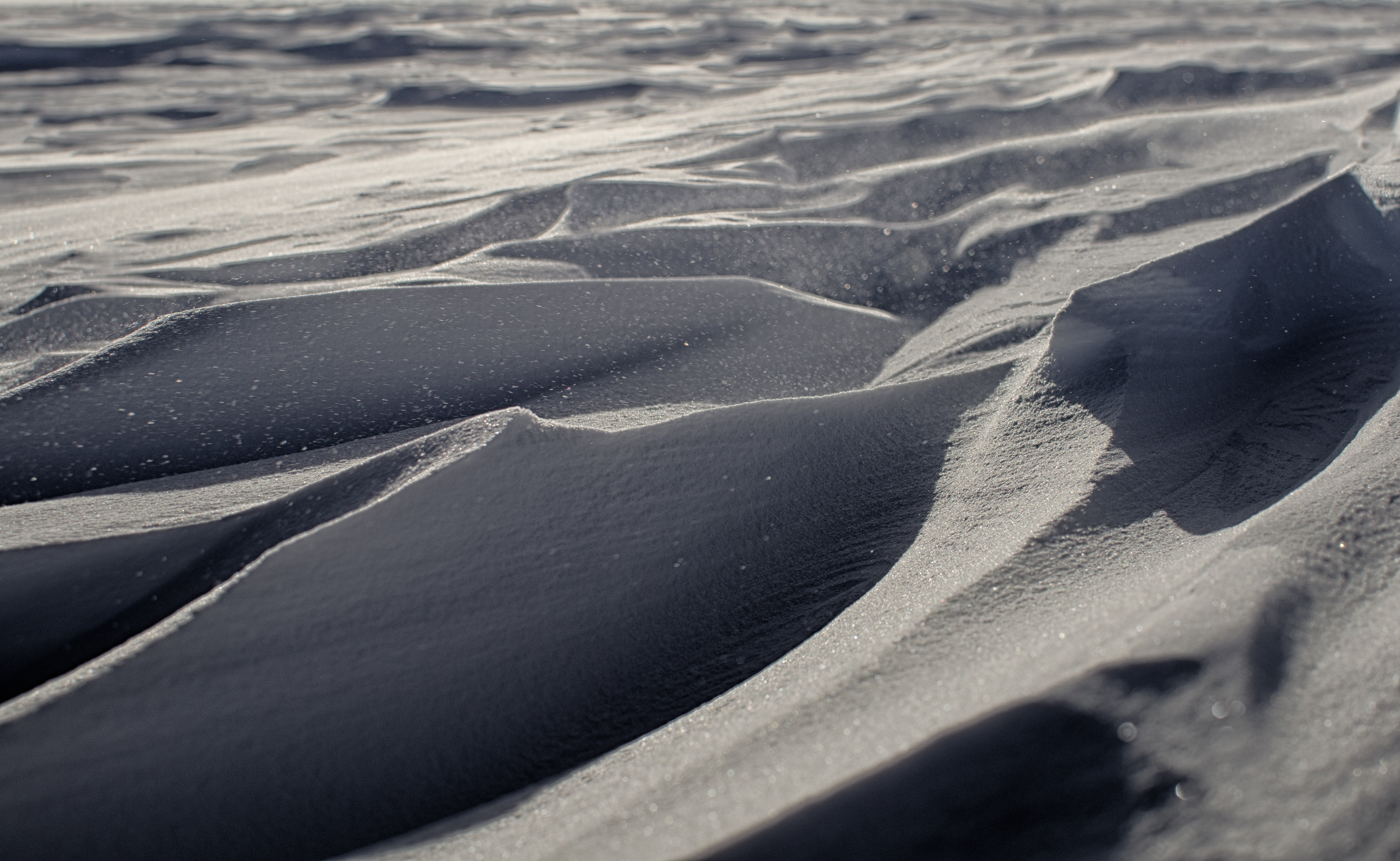
Wind sculpted snow near South Pole Station, forming sastrugi features.

Sastrugi, or zastrugi, are features formed by the erosion of snow by wind. They are found in polar regions, and in snowy, wind-swept areas of temperate regions, such as frozen lakes or mountain ridges. Sastrugi are distinguished by upwind-facing points, resembling anvils, which move downwind as the surface erodes. These points usually lie along ridges parallel to the prevailing wind; they are steep on the windward side and sloping to the leeward side. Smaller irregularities of this type are known as ripples (small, ~10 mm high) or wind ridges.

Large sastrugi are troublesome to skiers and snowboarders. Traveling on the irregular surface of sastrugi can be very tiring and can risk breaking equipment; ripples and waves are often undercut, and the surface is hard and unforgiving, with constant minor topographic changes between ridge and trough.

== Etymology ==
The words sastrugi and zastrugi are Russian-language plurals; the singular is zastruga. The form sastruga started as the German-language transliteration of the Russian word заструга (plural: заструги).

A Latin-type analogical singular sastrugus is used in various writings on exploration of the South Pole, including Robert Falcon Scott's expedition's diaries and Ernest Shackleton's The Heart of the Antarctic.

== Formation mechanism ==
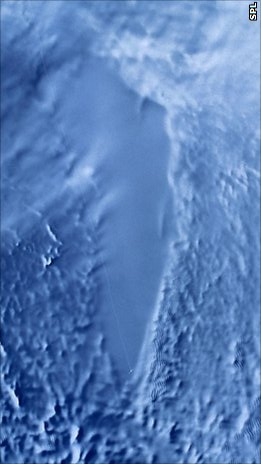
Large sastrugi seen in radar image around the south edge (left side) of Lake Vostok in Antarctica (RADARSAT, NASA). White and black colors on sastrugi are not lights and shadows; they demonstrate a difference in radioreflectivity of snow deposits on the windward and leeward sides of a sastruga.

Under the action of steady wind, free snow particles accumulate and drift like the sand grains in barchan dunes, and the resulting drifting snow shapes are also popularly referred to as barchans. Inuit of Canada call them kalutoqaniq. When winds slacken, the drifted formations consolidate via sublimation and recrystallization. Subsequent winds erode kalutoqaniq into the sculptured forms of sastrugi. Inuit call large sculpturings kaioqlaq and small ripples tumarinyiq. Further erosion may turn kaioqlaq back into drifting kalutoqaniq. An intermediate stage of erosion is mapsuk, an overhanging shape. On the windward side of a ridge, the base erodes faster than the top, producing a shape like an anvil tip pointing upwind.

== On sea ice ==
Sastrugi are more likely to form on first-year sea ice than on multiyear ice. First-year ice is smoother than multiyear ice, which allows the wind to pass uniformly over the surface without topographic obstructions. Except during the melt season, snow is dry and light in climates cold enough for sea ice, allowing the snow to be easily blown and create sastrugi parallel to the wind direction. The locations of sastrugi are fixed by March in the northern hemisphere and may be linked to the formation of melt ponds. Melt ponds are more likely to form in the depressions between sastrugi on first-year ice.

== See also ==
- Cape Sastrugi
- Cornice (snow)
- Föhn wind
- Snowdrift
