= Surge channel =

Type of coastal landform

Surge channel on the West Coast Trail, Vancouver Island.

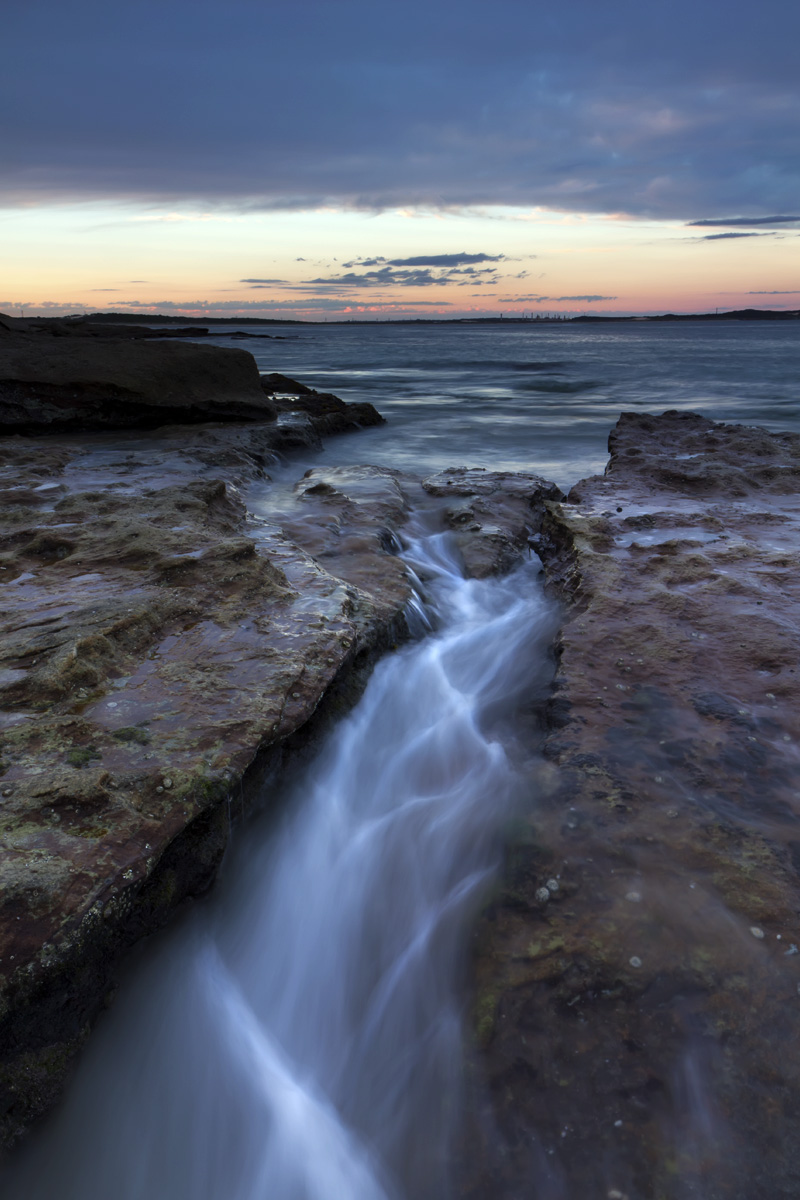
Surge channel at Cronulla, New South Wales

A surge channel is a narrow inlet, usually on a rocky shoreline, and is formed by differential erosion of those rocks by coastal wave action. As waves strike the shore, water fills the channel, and drains out again as the waves retreat. The narrow confines of the channel create powerful currents that reverse themselves rapidly as the water level rises and falls, and cause violent hydrodynamic mixing. However, there is relatively little exchange of water between channels; experimental studies and mathematical modelling of the coastline near Hopkins Marine Station in California have shown that water is rapidly mixed within each channel, but that it mostly moves in an oscillatory manner. Surge channels have been likened to 'containment vessels', retaining water borne gametes and probably enhancing the effectiveness of external fertilisation of marine species dwelling within them.

Surge channels can form in reefs, and the term is sometimes also applied to breaches of coastal dunes by storms.

Surge channels can range from a few inches across to ten feet or more across. They may create tide pools if the conditions are suitable, but the rapid water movement typically creates a dangerous situation for people or animals that are caught by the current. The West Coast Trail on the coast of Vancouver Island is known for its large number of surge channels, some of which are impassable even at low tide and must be crossed inland.

== See also ==
- Geo (landform)
