= Dirt cone =

Depositional glacial feature of ice or snow with an insulating layer of dirt

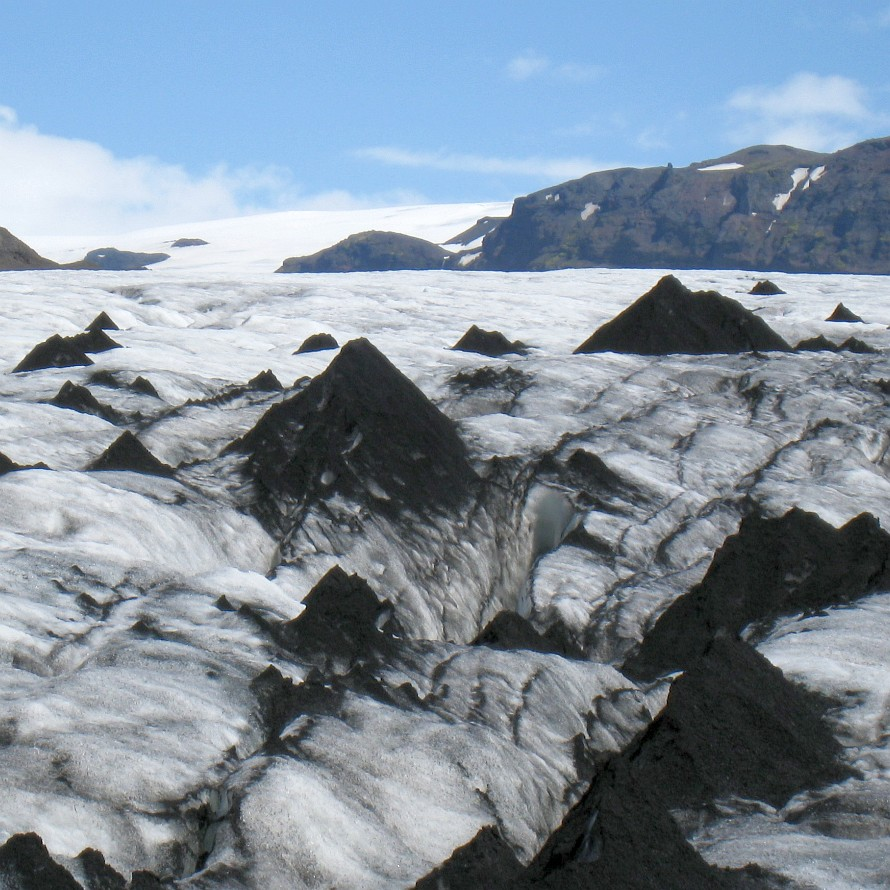
Large dirt cones on Sólheimajökull, Island

A dirt cone is a type of depositional glacial feature. Dirt cones are not actually made entirely of dirt. They have a core of ice, snow, or firn that gets covered with material and insulated. The material, if it is thick enough, will protect the underlying core from ablation. The thickness of material needed to insulate the core is called the “critical thickness.” If the material is less thick than the critical thickness, it will actually speed up erosion of the core through ablation. This is called “indirect ablation.” The cone would then begin melting and shrinking away.

== Formation ==
Formation of a dirt cone on a glacier

Dirt cones begin forming in a crevasse or a hollow. Dirt, dust, or moraine deposit material will fall into the crevasse in the glacier and build up over time. At the same time, the surrounding glacier lowers through ablation until the dirt filled crevasse is exposed and the material begins to spread out of top of the glacier. The rest of the glacier continues to lower as the material mound grows higher and taller. Any ice, snow, or firn trapped under the material will be insulated and protected from erosion. It begins forming a conical shape as the sides steepen to an angle that is unstable. Material falls down and protects the sides. The more material is added to the top, the more insulated the core becomes. Over time, it becomes a cone with a layer of material on the outside and a core of ice, snow, or firn on the inside. The material at the top of the cone is generally thicker than the material on the sides of the dirt cone.

Cones can also be found on snow patches. Many snow patches contain a certain amount of debris on them, blown in on the wind. Typically, this is a course grained sand or organic material. The sand is quite porous which makes it a poor conductor of heat. During extreme wind events, this sand or organic matter is carried onto the snow patch. The snow lying underneath the porous sand is protected from the heat and does not erode away. The snow not protected by a layer of sand or organic matter begins to erode through ablation. The protected areas accumulate more sand and eventually take on a conical shape. The core of snow is protected from ablation while the surrounding snow patch continues to melt. This is another way dirt cones can form.

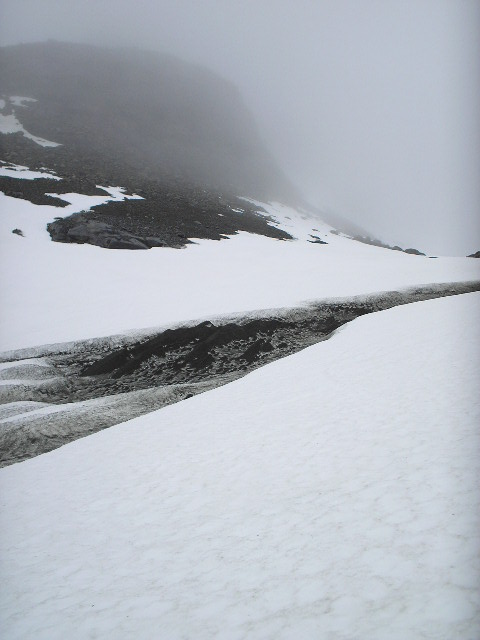
Small dirt cones near the Kårsa glacier in Kårsavagge, Sweden

Even areas with a very small debris load, like Antarctica, can have dirt cones. The dirt cones in Antarctica are formed from the moraine deposit material left behind when a glacier retreats. The material making up these cones can be sorted or unsorted. Sorted moraine material is sorted by water. Sorting refers to the material size. Well-sorted material is all the same size. Unsorted material consists of all different sizes. For instance, there are smaller grained particles, like clay aggregates, next to boulders and gravel. Both sorted and unsorted moraine material is used in Antarctica to make dirt cones. Dirt cones were previously not thought to be formed in Antarctica.

Some cones are only a few centimeters tall, while others can be up to 30 meters high. The larger dirt cones are commonly multiple cones that have fused (melted) together. As an ice sheet or glacier melts and retreats, the cones on the surface are brought together and eventually fuse together. This strengthens the ice core and creates a thicker layer of material on the outside to protect the hardened core from eroding. They can develop in one winter season or they can be a product of several seasons. Sometimes, they form as a single cone or as multiple cones in a ridge on moraine deposits. Generally, there are many cones on a glacier, snow patch, or ice sheet. They may be similar in size and material.

Dirt cones are found all over the globe, in both arctic and temperate regions. They are not limited to one geographic region. They have been seen in Iceland, Alaska, Antarctica, in the Himalayas, Norway, Canada, and Greenland. Many of these cones have been studied and surveyed to better understand their dynamics. All they need to form is debris of some sort and ice.
