= Barchan =

Crescent-shaped dune

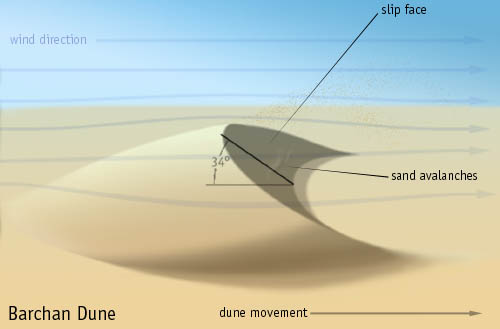
Diagram of a barchan

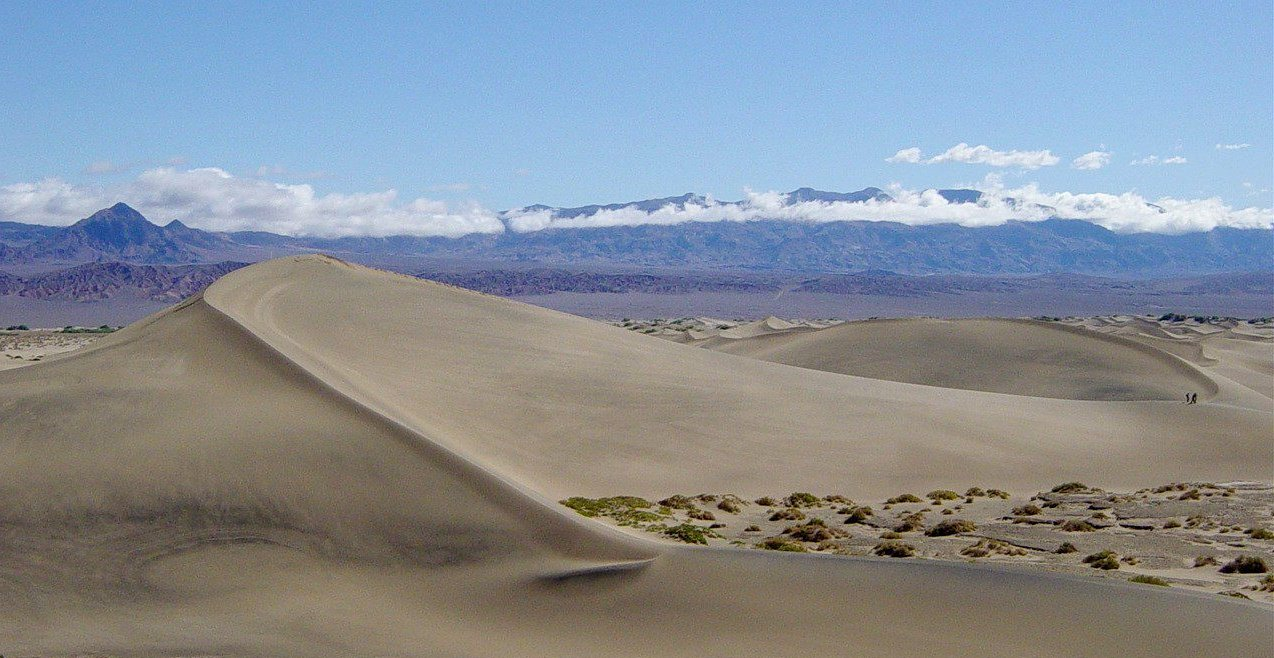
Typical shape

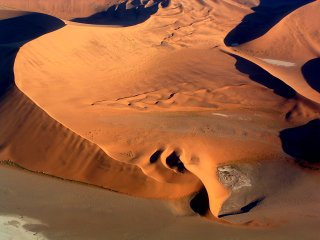
Barchan in the Namib Desert

A barchan or barkhan dune (from Kazakh бархан [bɑɾˈχɑn]) is a crescent-shaped dune.

Russian naturalist Alexander von Middendorf introduced the term in 1881, working from the occurrence of barchans in Turkestan and in other inland desert regions. Barchans "face" the wind, appearing convex, and are produced by wind action predominantly from one direction. They are a very common landform in sandy deserts all over the world and are arc-shaped, markedly asymmetrical in cross section, with a gentle slope facing toward the wind sand ridge, comprising well-sorted sand.

This type of dune possesses two "horns" that face downwind, with the steeper slope known as the slip face, facing away from the wind, downwind, at the angle of repose of the sand in question, approximately 30–35 degrees for medium-fine dry sand. The upwind side is packed by the wind, and stands at about 15 degrees. Barchans may be 9–30 m (30–98 ft) high and 370 m (1,210 ft) wide at the base measured perpendicular to the wind.

Simple barchan dunes may appear as larger, compound barchan or megabarchan dunes, which can gradually migrate with the wind as a result of erosion on the windward side and deposition on the leeward side, at a rate of migration ranging from about one meter to 100 meters per year. Barchans usually occur as groups of isolated dunes and may form chains that extend across a plain in the direction of the prevailing wind. Barchans and mega-barchans may coalesce into ridges that extend for hundreds of kilometers. Dune collisions and changes in wind direction spawn new barchans from the horns of the old ones and govern the size distribution of a given field.

As barchan dunes migrate, smaller dunes outpace larger dunes, catching-up the rear of the larger dune and eventually appear to punch through the large dune to appear on the other side. The process appears superficially similar to waves of light, sound, or water that pass directly through each other, but the detailed mechanism is very different. The dunes emulate soliton behavior, but unlike solitons, which flow through a medium leaving it undisturbed (similar to waves passing through water), the sand particles themselves are moved. When the smaller dune catches up the larger dune, the winds begin to deposit sand on the rear dune while blowing sand off the front dune without replenishing it. Eventually, the rear dune has assumed dimensions similar to the former front dune which has now become a smaller, faster moving dune that pulls away with the wind.

Barchan dunes have been observed on Mars, where the thin atmosphere produces winds strong enough to move sand and dust. Marine barchan dunes appear underwater as sands shift their way across the seabed.

== See also ==
- Great Sand Dunes National Park and Preserve – National park in Colorado, United States
- Sastrugi, also known as Zastruga – Sharp irregular grooves or ridges formed on a snow surface, about snowforms of similar mechanism
