= Homoclinal ridge =

Ridge with a moderate sloping backslope and steeper frontslope

A homoclinal ridge or strike ridge is a hill or ridge with a moderate, generally between 10° and 30°, sloping backslope. Its backslope is a dip slope, that conforms with the dip of a resistant stratum or strata, called caprock. On the other side of the other slope, which is its frontslope, of a homoclinal ridge is a steeper or even cliff-like frontslope (escarpment) that is formed by the outcrop of the caprock. The escarpment cuts through the dipping strata that comprises the homoclinal ridge.

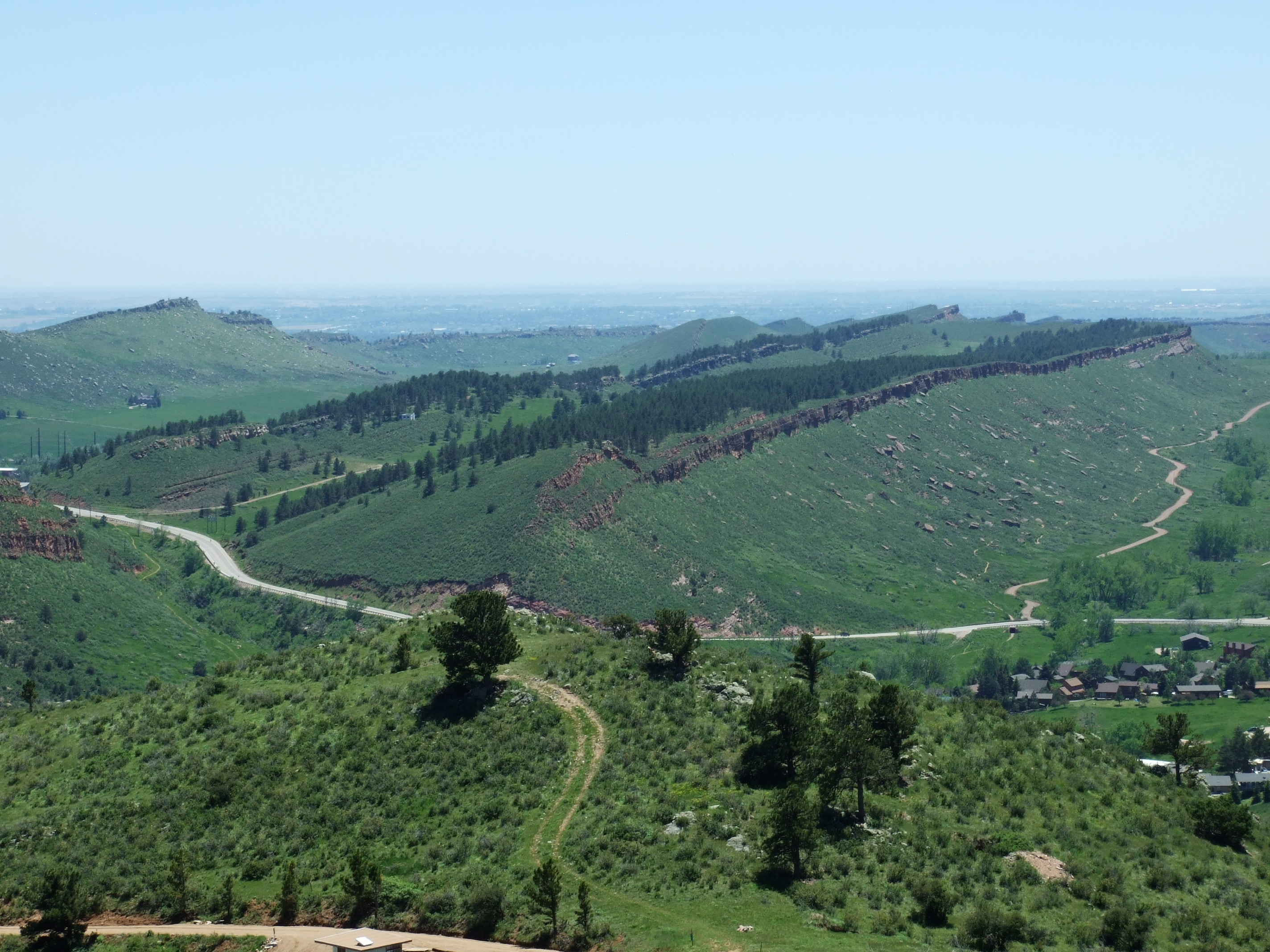
Escarpments of homoclinal ridges southwest of Fort Collins, Colorado, USA. The distant ridge is Dakota sandstone. The prominent ridges in the center of the photo are sandstones of the Lyons and Ingleside formations.

Homoclinal ridges are the expression of regional outcrops of moderately dipping strata, typically sedimentary strata, that consist of alternating beds of hard, well-lithified strata, i.e. sandstone and limestone and weak or loosely cemented strata, i.e. shale, mudstone, and marl. The surface of hard, erosion-resistant rock strata forms the caprock of the backslope (dip-slope) of the homoclinal ridges from which erosion has preferentially stripped any weaker strata. The opposite slope, its frontslope, that forms the front of a homoclinal ridge consists of an escarpment that cuts across the bedding of the strata comprising it. Because of the moderately dipping nature of the strata that forms a homoclinal ridge, a significant shift in horizontal location will take place the landscape is lowered by erosion. Because the slope of a homoclinal ridge dips in the same direction as the sedimentary strata underlying it, the dip angle of this bedding (Ө) can be calculated by v/h= tan(Ө) where v is equal to the vertical distance and h is equal to the horizontal distance perpendicular to the strike of the beds.

Cuestas, homoclinal ridges, and hogbacks comprise a sequence of landforms that form a gradational continuum. These landforms differ only on the steepness of their backslopes and relative differences in the inclination of their backslopes and frontslopes. These differences depends upon whether the dip of the strata from which they have been eroded are either nearly vertical, moderately dipping, or gently dipping. In general, homoclinal ridges, or strike ridges, are associated with strata that dip between 10° and 30°. The symmetrical ridges that characterize hogbacks develop where the strata dip very steeply at 40° or more. Because they are gradational in nature, the exact angle of the backslope used to define these landforms is arbitrary and can vary in the scientific literature.
