= Laterite =

Product of rock weathering in wet tropical climates rich in iron and aluminium

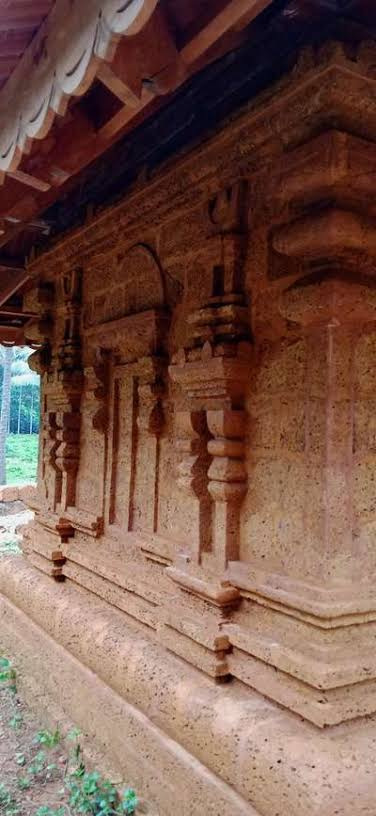
Traditional laterite temple in Kerala

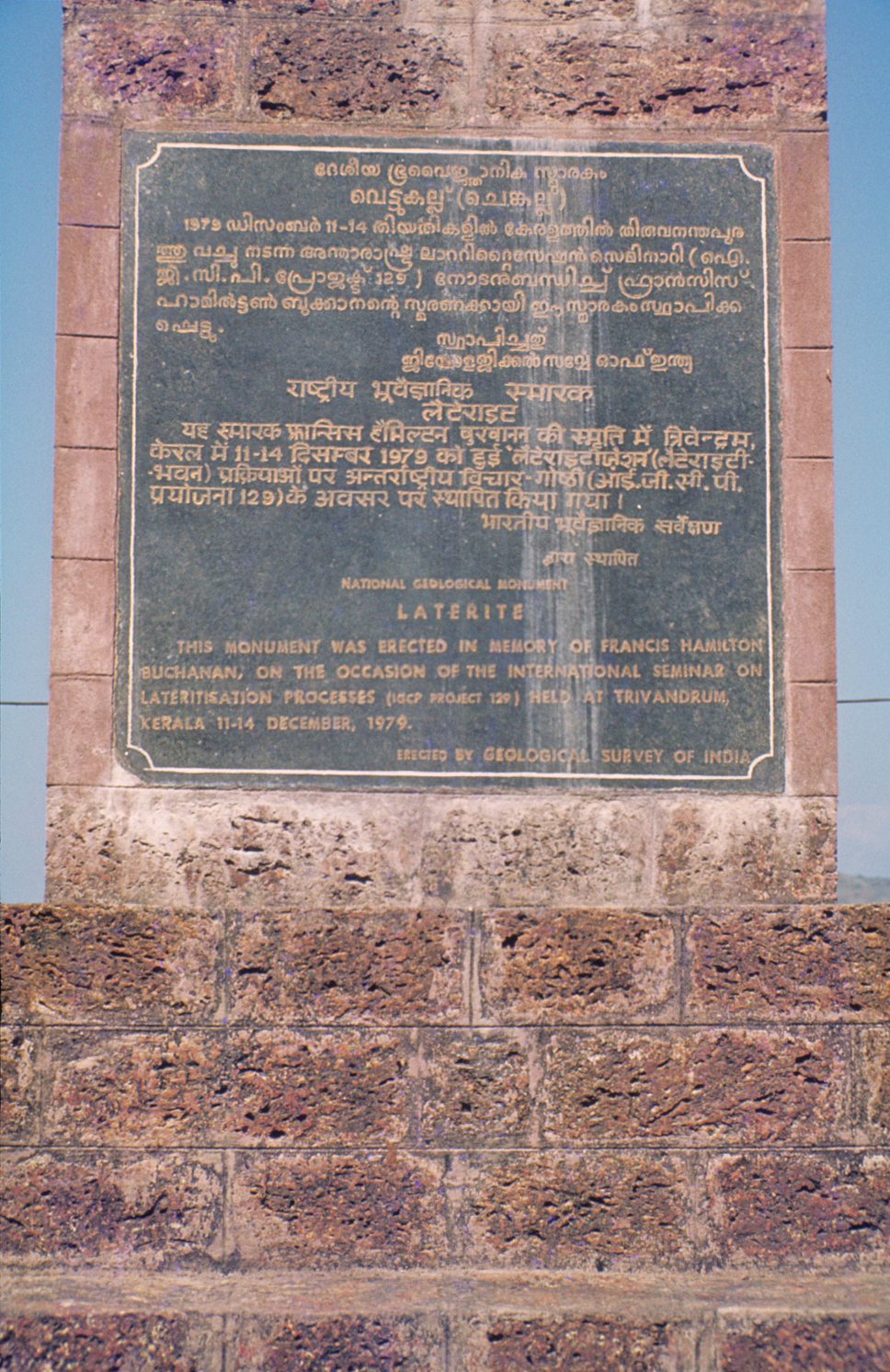
Monument of laterite brickstones at Angadipuram, Kerala, India, which commemorates where laterite was first described and discussed by Buchanan-Hamilton in 1807

Laterite is a soil type rich in iron and aluminum that often forms in hot, wet areas; most such soil is found in the tropics. Nearly all laterites are of rusty-red coloration due to high iron oxide content.

Laterite soils develop by intensive and prolonged weathering of the underlying parent rock, usually under conditions of high temperatures and heavy rainfall alternating with dry periods, in a process called laterization. Such prolonged chemical weathering produces a wide variety in the thickness, grade, chemistry and ore mineralogy of the resulting soils. Aside from this variety, laterite has commonly been considered a rock type as well as a soil type. These facts, and further ways of conceiving the nature of laterite (e.g. as a complete weathering profile or even a theory about weathering), have led to calls for the term to be abandoned altogether. At least a few researchers specializing in regolith development, including T. R. Paton and M. A. J. Williams, have suggested that hopeless confusion has evolved around the name.

Historically, laterite was cut into brick-like shapes and used in monument-building. After 1000 AD, construction at Angkor Wat and other southeast Asian sites changed to rectangular temple enclosures made of laterite, brick, and stone. Since the mid-1970s, some trial sections of bituminous-surfaced, low-volume roads have used laterite in place of stone as a base course. Thick laterite layers are porous and slightly permeable, so the layers can function as aquifers in rural areas. Locally available laterites have also been used to treat sewage, for example in an acid solution followed by precipitation to remove phosphorus and heavy metals.

Laterites are a source of aluminum ore; the ore exists largely in clay minerals and the hydroxide minerals gibbsite, boehmite, and diaspore, and so resembles the composition of bauxite, the world's main source of aluminum ore. In Northern Ireland laterites once provided a major source of iron and aluminum ores. Laterite ores also were the early major source of nickel.

== Definition and physical description ==
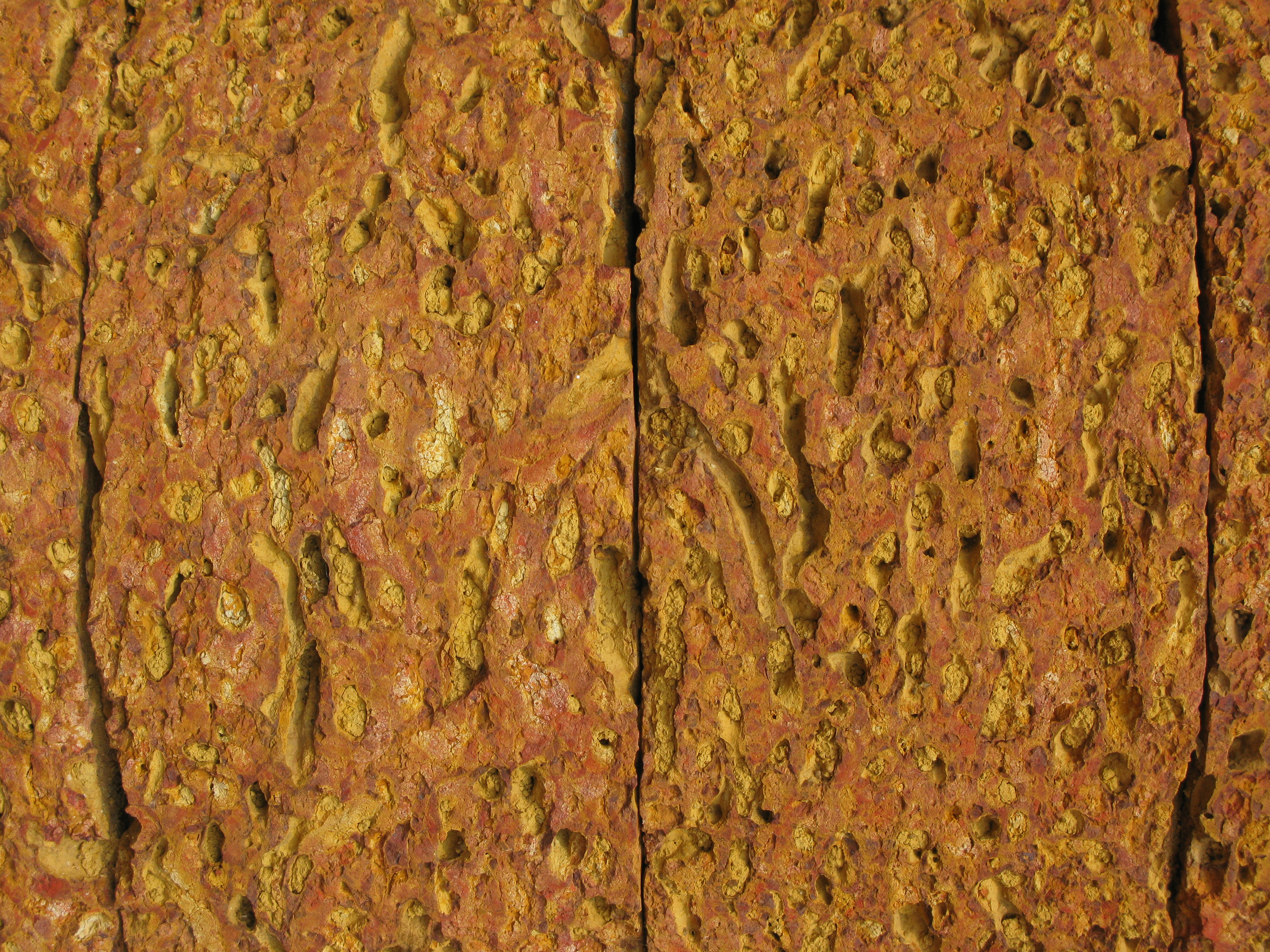
Laterite in Sơn Tây, Hanoi, Vietnam

Francis Buchanan-Hamilton first described and named a laterite formation in southern India in 1807. He named it laterite from the Latin word later, which means a brick; this highly compacted and cemented soil can easily be cut into brick-shaped blocks for building. The word laterite has been used for variably cemented, sesquioxide-rich soil horizons. A sesquioxide is an oxide with three atoms of oxygen and two metal atoms. It has also been used for any reddish soil at or near the Earth's surface.

Laterite covers are thick in the stable areas of the Western Ethiopian Shield, on cratons of the South American Plate, and on the Australian Shield. In Madhya Pradesh, India, the laterite which caps the plateau is 30 m (100 ft) thick. Laterites can be either soft and easily broken into smaller pieces, or firm and physically resistant. Basement rocks are buried under the thick weathered layer and rarely exposed. Lateritic soils form the uppermost part of the laterite cover.

In some places laterites contain pisolites and ferricrete, and they may be found in elevated positions as result of relief inversion.

Cliff Ollier has criticized the usefulness of the concept given that it is used to mean different things to different authors. Reportedly some have used it for ferricrete, others for tropical red earth soil, and yet others for soil profiles made, from top to bottom, of a crust, a mottled zone and a pallid zone. He cautions strongly against the concept of "lateritic deep weathering" since "it begs so many questions".

== Formation ==
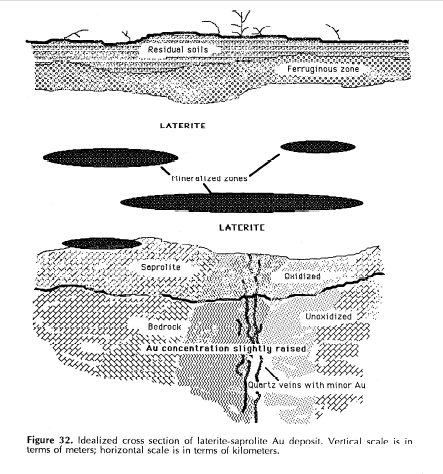
Laterite is often located under residual soils.

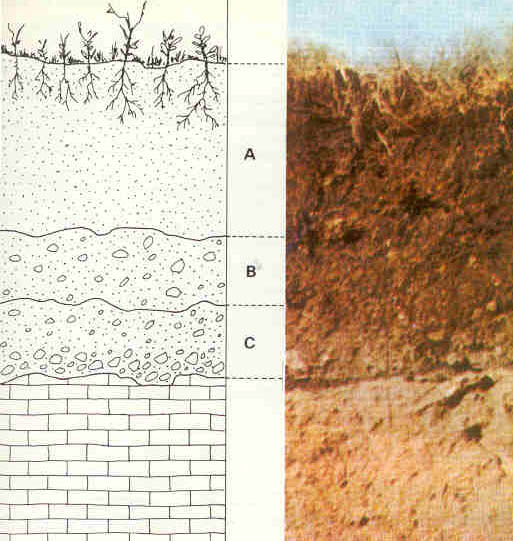
Soil layers, from soil down to bedrock: A represents soil; B represents laterite, a regolith; C represents saprolite, a less-weathered regolith; below C is bedrock

Tropical weathering (laterization) is a prolonged process of chemical weathering which produces a wide variety in the thickness, grade, chemistry and ore mineralogy of the resulting soils. The initial products of weathering are essentially kaolinized rocks called saprolites. A period of active laterization extended from about the mid-Tertiary to the mid-Quaternary periods (35 to 1.5 million years ago). Statistical analyses show that the transition in the mean and variance levels of ^{18}O during the middle of the Pleistocene was abrupt. It seems this abrupt change was global and mainly represents an increase in ice mass; at about the same time an abrupt decrease in sea surface temperatures occurred; these two changes indicate a sudden global cooling. The rate of laterization would have decreased with the abrupt cooling of the earth. Weathering in tropical climates continues to this day, at a reduced rate.

Laterites are formed from the leaching of parent sedimentary rocks (sandstones, clays, limestones); metamorphic rocks (schists, gneisses, migmatites); igneous rocks (granites, basalts, gabbros, peridotites); and mineralized proto-ores; which leaves the more insoluble ions, predominantly iron and aluminum. The mechanism of leaching involves acid dissolving the host mineral lattice, followed by hydrolysis and precipitation of insoluble oxides and sulfates of iron, aluminum and silica under the high temperature conditions of a humid sub-tropical monsoon climate.

An essential feature for the formation of laterite is the repetition of wet and dry seasons. Rocks are leached by percolating rain water during the wet season; the resulting solution containing the leached ions is brought to the surface by capillary action during the dry season. These ions form soluble salt compounds which dry on the surface; these salts are washed away during the next wet season. Laterite formation is favored in low topographical reliefs of gentle crests and plateaus which prevents erosion of the surface cover. The reaction zone where rocks are in contact with water—from the lowest to highest water table levels—is progressively depleted of the easily leached ions of sodium, potassium, calcium and magnesium. A solution of these ions can have the correct pH to preferentially dissolve silicon oxide rather than the aluminum oxides and iron oxides. Silcrete has been suggested to form in zones in relatively dry "precipitating zones" of laterites. To the contrary, in the wetter parts of laterites subject to leaching ferricretes have been suggested to form.

The mineralogical and chemical compositions of laterites are dependent on their parent rocks. Laterites consist mainly of quartz, zircon, and oxides of titanium, iron, tin, aluminum and manganese, which remain during the course of weathering. Quartz is the most abundant relic mineral from the parent rock.

Laterites vary significantly according to their location, climate and depth. The main host minerals for nickel and cobalt can be either iron oxides, clay minerals or manganese oxides. Iron oxides are derived from mafic igneous rocks and other iron-rich rocks; bauxites are derived from granitic igneous rock and other iron-poor rocks. Nickel laterites occur in zones of the earth which experienced prolonged tropical weathering of ultramafic rocks containing the ferro-magnesian minerals olivine, pyroxene, and amphibole.

== Locations ==
Yves Tardy, from the French Institut National Polytechnique de Toulouse and the Centre National de la Recherche Scientifique, calculated that laterites cover about one-third of the Earth's continental land area. Lateritic soils are the subsoils of the equatorial forests, of the savannas of the humid tropical regions, and of the Sahelian steppes. They cover most of the land area between the tropics of Cancer and Capricorn; areas not covered within these latitudes include the extreme western portion of South America, the southwestern portion of Africa, the desert regions of north-central Africa, the Arabian peninsula and the interior of Australia.

Some of the oldest and most highly deformed ultramafic rocks which underwent laterization are found as petrified fossil soils in the complex Precambrian shields in Brazil and Australia. Smaller highly deformed Alpine-type intrusives have formed laterite profiles in Guatemala, Colombia, Central Europe, India and Burma. Large thrust sheets of Mesozoic island arcs and continental collision zones underwent laterization in New Caledonia, Cuba, Indonesia and the Philippines. Laterites reflect past weathering conditions; laterites which are found in present-day non-tropical areas are products of former geological epochs, when that area was near the equator. Present-day laterite occurring outside the humid tropics are considered to be indicators of climatic change, continental drift or a combination of both. In India, laterite soils occupy an area of 240,000 square kilometres.

== Uses ==
=== Agriculture ===
Laterite soils have a high clay content, which means they have higher cation exchange capacity, low permeability, high plasticity and high water-holding capacity than sandy soils. It is because the particles are so small, the water is trapped between them. After the rain, the water moves into the soil slowly. Due to intensive leaching, laterite soils lack in fertility in comparison to other soils, however they respond readily to manuring and irrigation. Palms are less likely to suffer from drought because the rainwater is held in the soil. However, if the structure of lateritic soils becomes degraded, a hard crust can form on the surface, which hinders water infiltration, the emergence of seedlings, and leads to increased runoff. It is possible to rehabilitate such soils, using a system called the 'bio-reclamation of degraded lands'. This involves using indigenous water-harvesting methods (such as planting pits and trenches), applying animal and plant residues, and planting high-value fruit trees and indigenous vegetable crops that are tolerant of drought conditions. These soils are most suitable for plantation crops. They are good for oil palm, tea, coffee and cashew cultivation. The International Crops Research Institute for the Semi-Arid Tropics (ICRISAT) has employed this system to rehabilitate degraded laterite soils in Niger and increase smallholder farmers' incomes. In some places, these soils support grazing grounds and scrub forests.

=== Building blocks ===
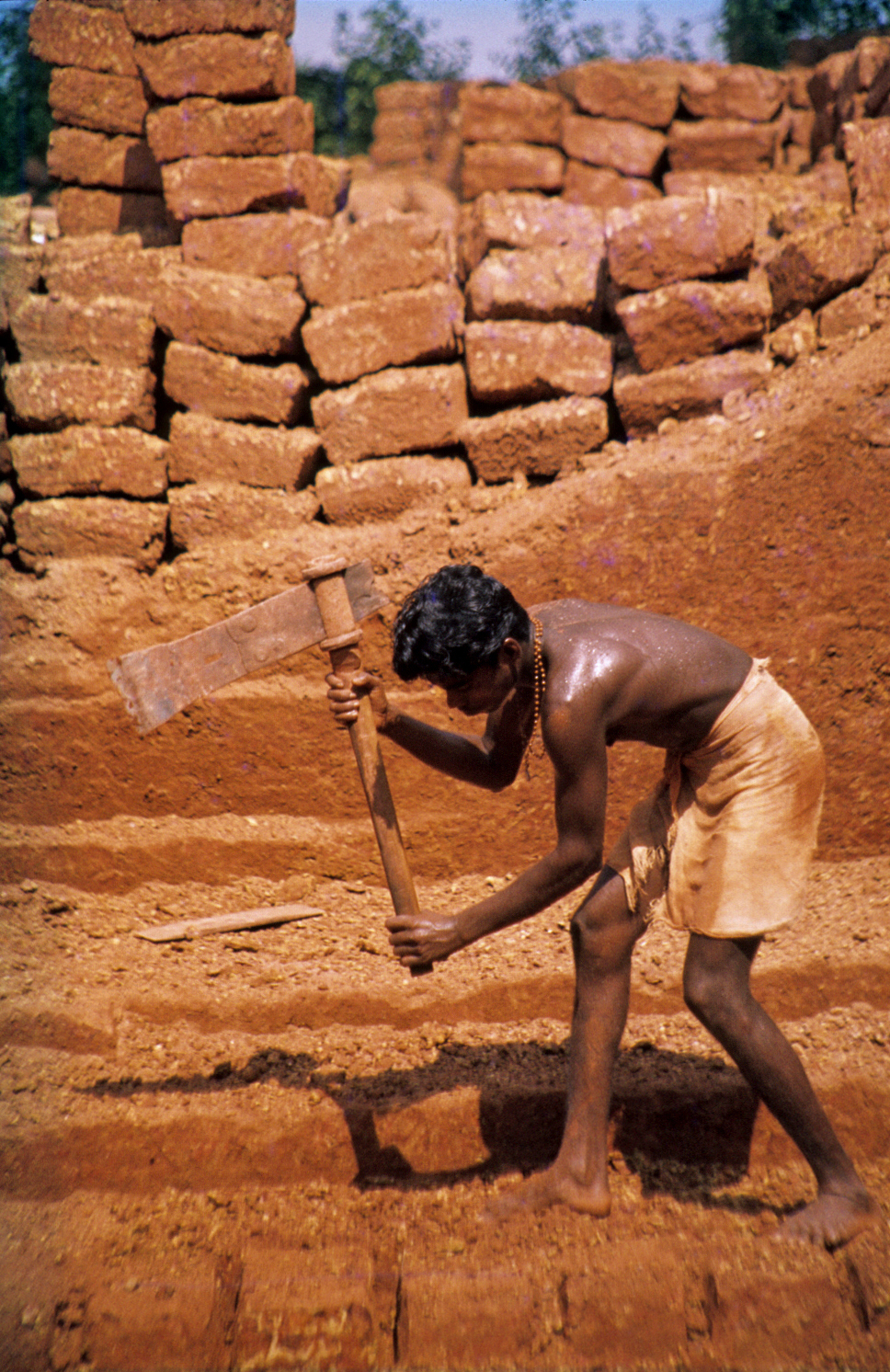
Cutting laterite bricks in Angadipuram, India

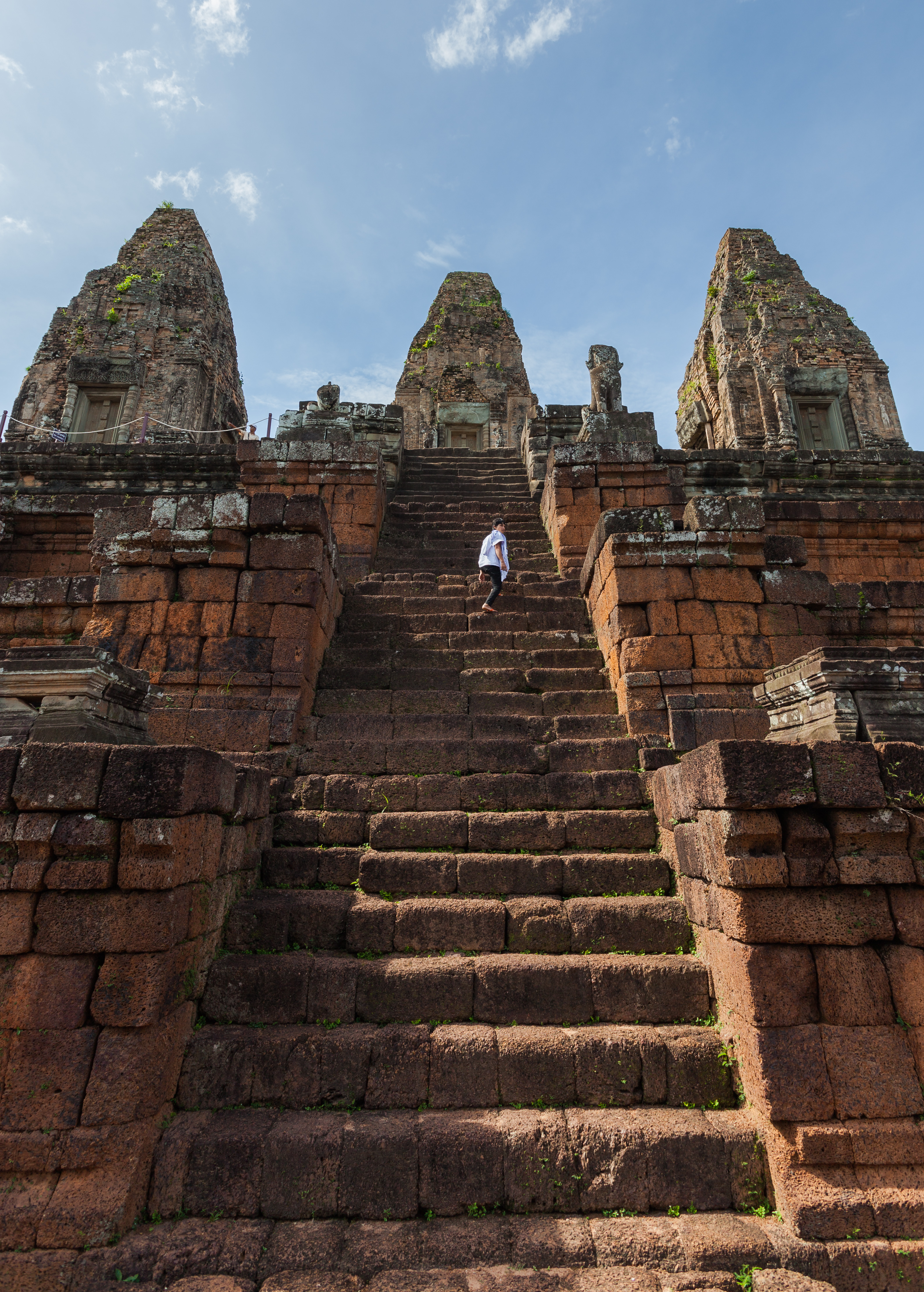
Example of construction with laterite in Pre Rup, Angkor, Cambodia.

When moist, laterites can easily be cut with a spade into regular-sized blocks. Laterite is mined while it is below the water table, so it is wet and soft. Upon exposure to air it gradually hardens as the moisture between the flat clay particles evaporates and the larger iron salts lock into a rigid lattice structure and become resistant to atmospheric conditions. The art of quarrying laterite material into masonry is suspected to have been introduced from the Indian subcontinent. They harden like iron when they are exposed to air.

After 1000 AD Angkorian construction changed from circular or irregular earthen walls to rectangular temple enclosures of laterite, brick and stone structures. Geographic surveys show areas which have laterite stone alignments which may be foundations of temple sites that have not survived. The Khmer people constructed the Angkor monuments—which are widely distributed in Cambodia and Thailand—between the 9th and 13th centuries. The stone materials used were sandstone and laterite; brick had been used in monuments constructed in the 9th and 10th centuries. Two types of laterite can be identified; both types consist of the minerals kaolinite, quartz, hematite and goethite. Differences in the amounts of minor elements arsenic, antimony, vanadium and strontium were measured between the two laterites.

Angkor Wat—located in present-day Cambodia—is the largest religious structure built by Suryavarman II, who ruled the Khmer Empire from 1112 to 1152. It is a World Heritage site. The sandstone used for the building of Angkor Wat is Mesozoic sandstone quarried in the Phnom Kulen Mountains, about 40 km (25 mi) away from the temple. The foundations and internal parts of the temple contain laterite blocks behind the sandstone surface. The masonry was laid without joint mortar.

It is used as a local building material in places such as Burkina Faso, where it is valued for being strong and for reducing heating and cooling costs.

=== Road building ===
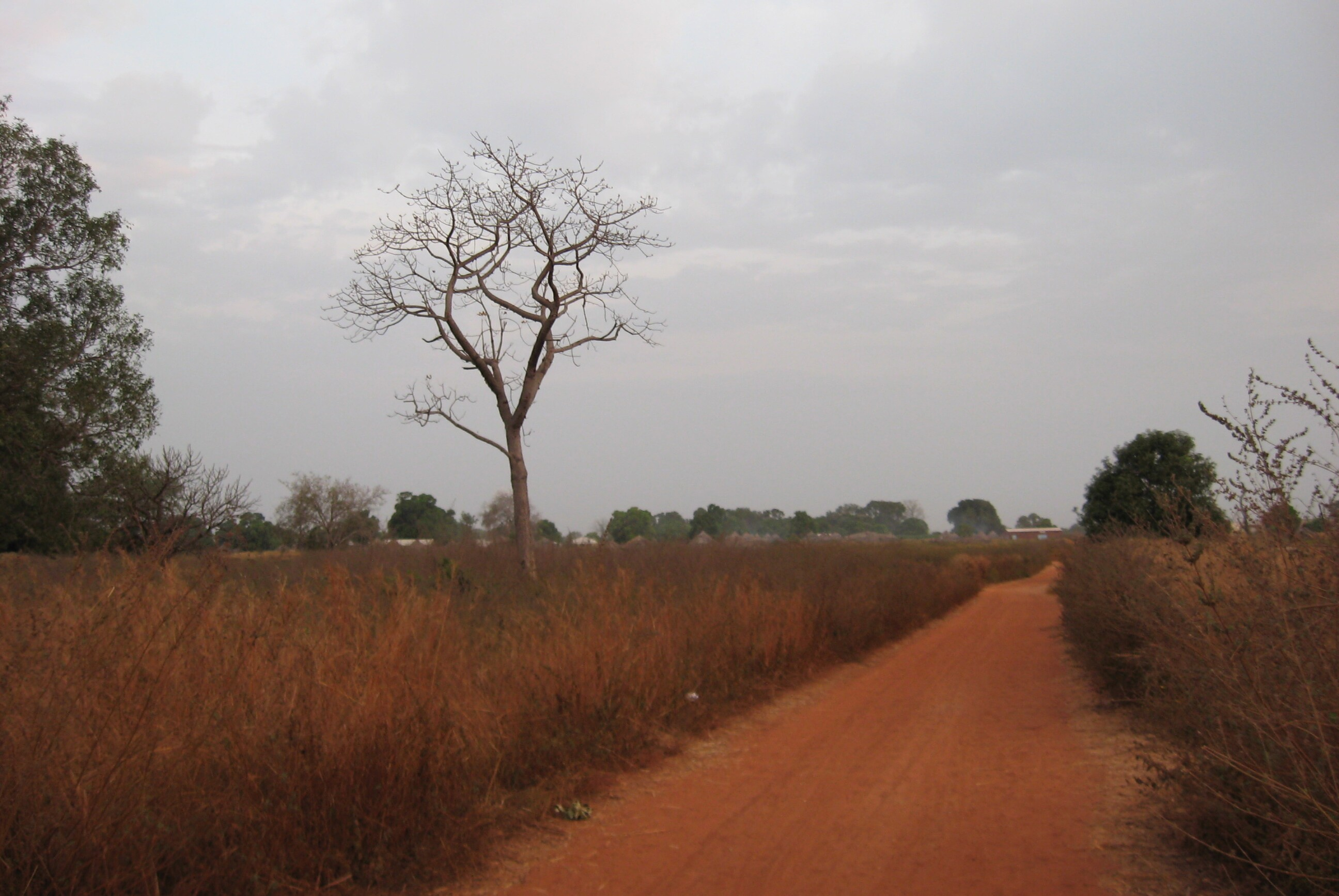
Laterite road near Kounkane, Upper Casamance, Senegal

The French surfaced roads in the Cambodia, Thailand and Vietnam area with crushed laterite, stone or gravel. Kenya, during the mid-1970s, and Malawi, during the mid-1980s, constructed trial sections of bituminous-surfaced low-volume roads using laterite in place of stone as a base course. The laterite did not conform with any accepted specifications but performed equally well when compared with adjoining sections of road using stone or other stabilized material as a base. In 1984 US$40,000 per 1 km (0.62 mi) was saved in Malawi by using laterite in this way. It is also widely used in Brazil for road building.

=== Water supply ===
Bedrock in tropical zones is often impermeable granite, gneiss, schist or sandstone; the thick laterite layer is porous and slightly permeable so the layer can function as an aquifer in rural areas. One example is the Southwestern Laterite (Cabook) Aquifer in Sri Lanka. This aquifer is on the southwest border of Sri Lanka, with the narrow Shallow Aquifers on Coastal Sands between it and the ocean. It has the considerable water-holding capacity, depending on the depth of the formation. The aquifer in this laterite recharges rapidly with the rains of April–May which follow the dry season of February–March, and continues to fill with the monsoon rains. The water table recedes slowly and is recharged several times during the rest of the year. In some high-density suburban areas the water table could recede to 15 m (50 ft) below ground level during a prolonged dry period of more than 65 days. The Cabook Aquifer laterites support relatively shallow aquifers that are accessible to dug wells.

=== Waste water treatment ===
In Northern Ireland, phosphorus enrichment of lakes due to agriculture is a significant problem. Locally available laterite—a low-grade bauxite rich in iron and aluminum—is used in acid solution, followed by precipitation to remove phosphorus and heavy metals at several sewage treatment facilities. Calcium-, iron- and aluminum-rich solid media are recommended for phosphorus removal. A study, using both laboratory tests and pilot-scale constructed wetlands, reports the effectiveness of granular laterite in removing phosphorus and heavy metals from landfill leachate. Initial laboratory studies show that laterite is capable of 99% removal of phosphorus from solution. A pilot-scale experimental facility containing laterite achieved 96% removal of phosphorus. This removal is greater than reported in other systems. Initial removals of aluminum and iron by pilot-scale facilities have been up to 85% and 98% respectively. Percolating columns of laterite removed enough cadmium, chromium and lead to undetectable concentrations. There is a possible application of this low-cost, low-technology, visually unobtrusive, efficient system for rural areas with dispersed point sources of pollution.

=== Ores ===
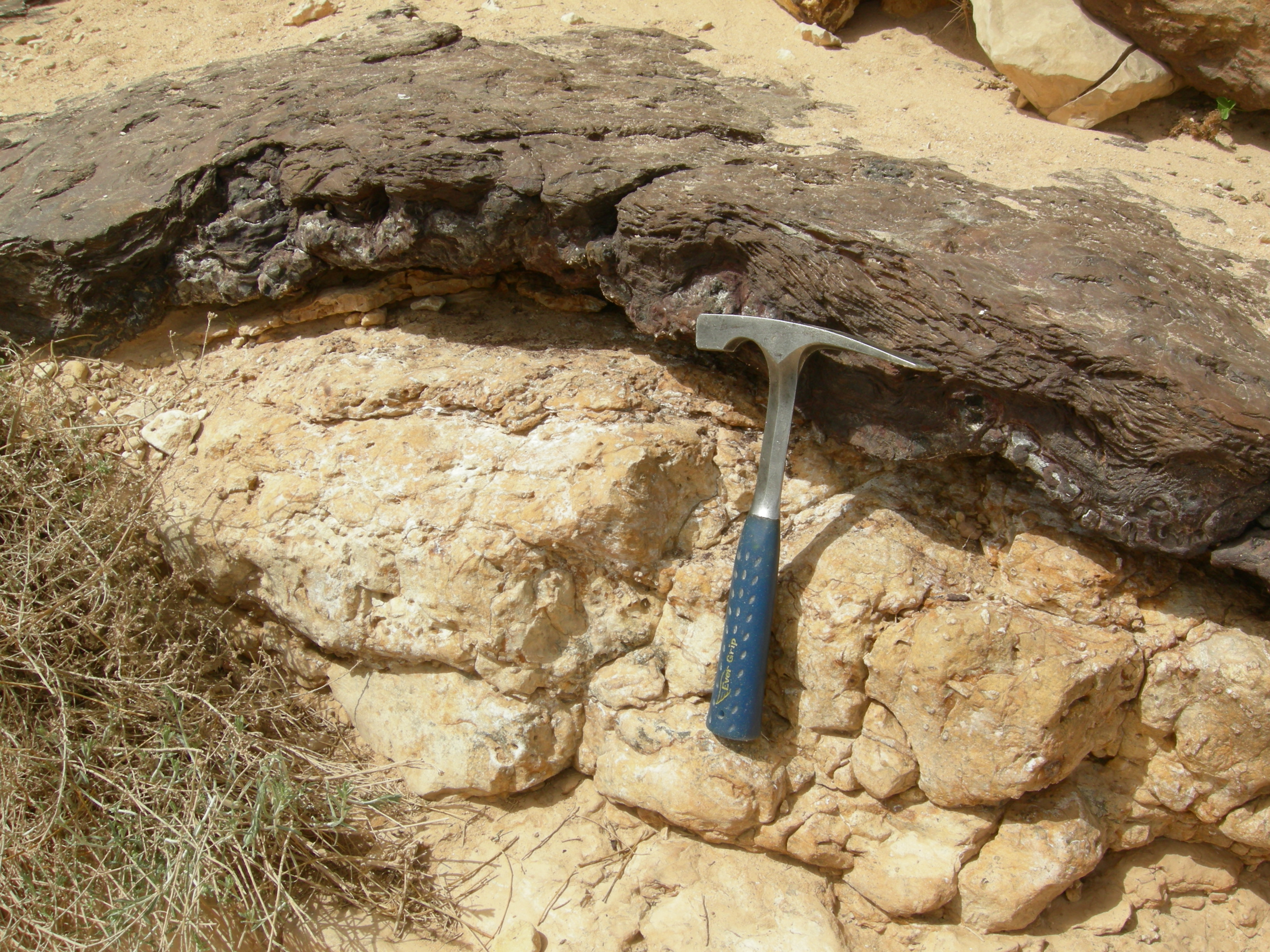
Cretaceous iron-rich laterite (the dark unit) in Hamakhtesh Hagadol, southern Israel.

Ores are concentrated in metalliferous laterites; aluminum is found in bauxites, iron and manganese are found in iron-rich hard crusts, nickel and copper are found in disintegrated rocks, and gold is found in mottled clays.

==== Bauxite ====
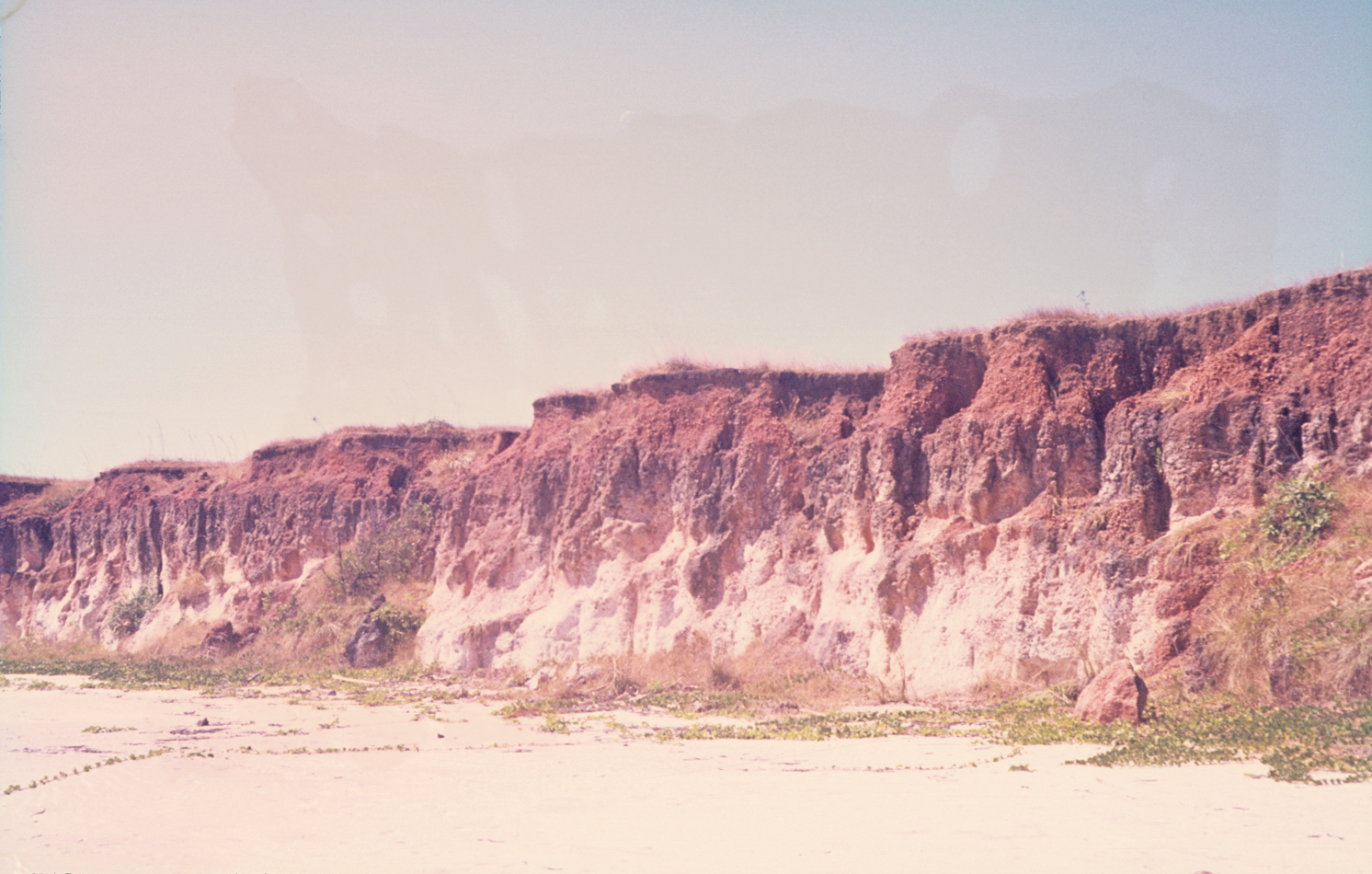
Bauxite on white kaolinitic sandstone at Pera Head, Weipa, Australia

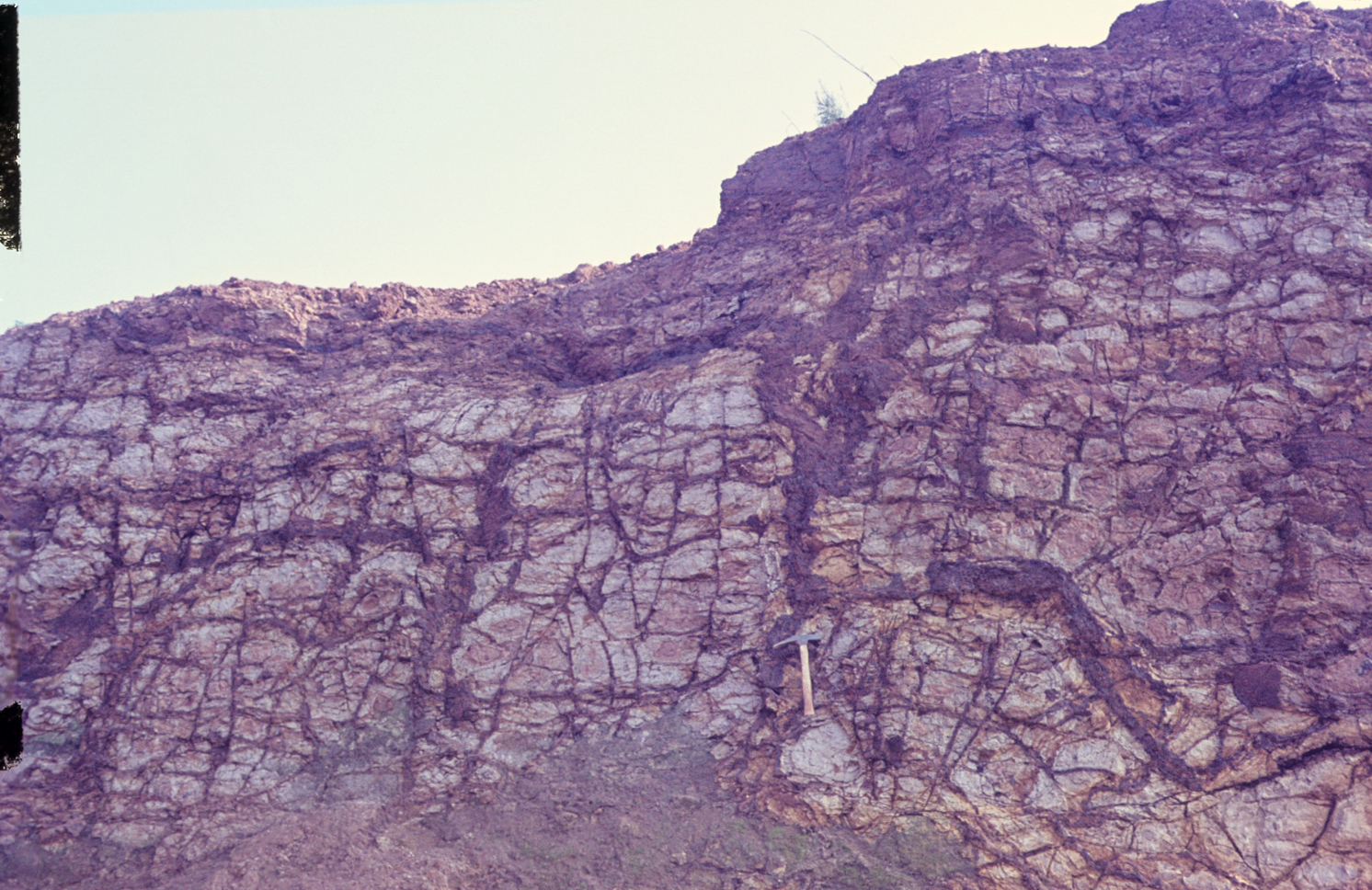
Mobilization and precipitation of iron in veins within kaolinized basalt. Hungen, Vogelsberg area, Germany

Bauxite ore is the main source of aluminum. It is a variety of laterite (residual sedimentary rock), so it has no precise chemical formula. It is composed mainly of hydrated alumina minerals such as gibbsite [Al(OH)_{3} or Al_{2}O_{3} . 3H_{2}O)] in newer tropical deposits; in older subtropical, temperate deposits the major minerals are boehmite [γ-AlO(OH) or Al_{2}O_{3}.H_{2}O] and some diaspore [α-AlO(OH) or Al_{2}O_{3}.H_{2}O]. The average chemical composition of bauxite, by weight, is 45 to 60% Al_{2}O_{3} and 20 to 30% Fe_{2}O_{3}. The remaining weight consists of silicas (quartz, chalcedony and kaolinite), carbonates (calcite, magnesite and dolomite), titanium dioxide and water. Bauxites of economical interest must be low in kaolinite. Formation of lateritic bauxites occurs worldwide in the 145- to 2-million-year-old Cretaceous and Tertiary coastal plains. The bauxites form elongate belts, sometimes hundreds of kilometers long, parallel to Lower Tertiary shorelines in India and South America; their distribution is not related to a particular mineralogical composition of the parent rock. Many high-level bauxites are formed in coastal plains which were subsequently uplifted to their present altitude.

==== Iron ====
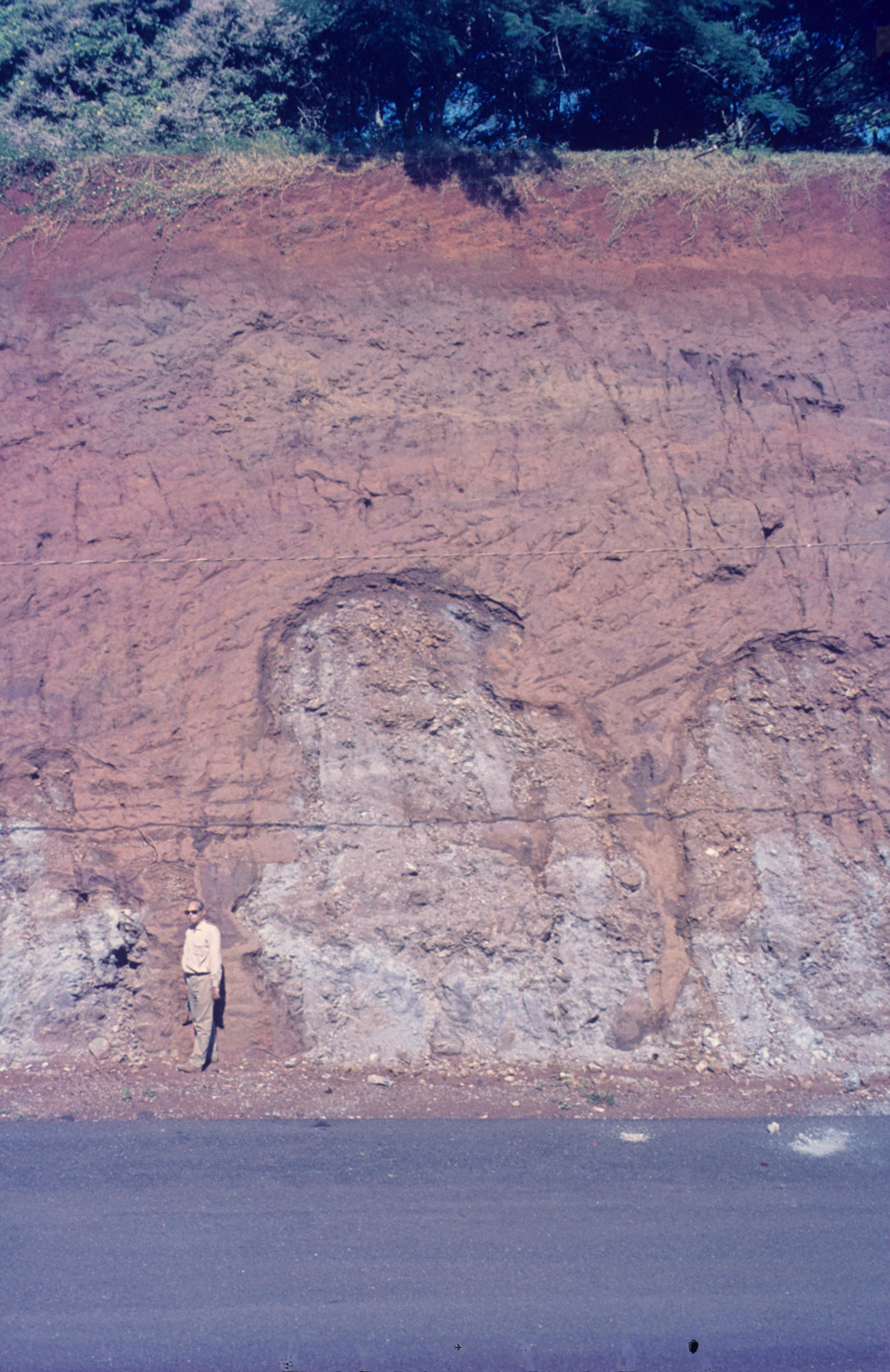
Irregular weathering of grey serpentinite to greyish-brown nickel-containing laterite with a high iron percentage (nickel limonite), near Mayagüez, Puerto Rico.

The basaltic laterites of Northern Ireland were formed by extensive chemical weathering of basalts during a period of volcanic activity. They reach a maximum thickness of 30 m (100 ft) and once provided a major source of iron and aluminum ore. Percolating waters caused degradation of the parent basalt and preferential precipitation by acidic water through the lattice left the iron and aluminum ores. Primary olivine, plagioclase feldspar and augite were successively broken down and replaced by a mineral assemblage consisting of hematite, gibbsite, goethite, anatase, halloysite and kaolinite.

==== Nickel ====
Laterite ores were the major source of early nickel. Rich laterite deposits in New Caledonia were mined starting the end of the 19th century to produce white metal. The discovery of sulfide deposits of Sudbury, Ontario, Canada, during the early part of the 20th century shifted the focus to sulfides for nickel extraction. About 70% of the Earth's land-based nickel resources are contained in laterites; they currently account for about 40% of the world nickel production. In 1950 laterite-source nickel was less than 10% of total production, in 2003 it accounted for 42%, and by 2012 the share of laterite-source nickel was expected to be 51%. The four main areas in the world with the largest nickel laterite resources are New Caledonia, with 21%; Australia, with 20%; the Philippines, with 17%; and Indonesia, with 12%.

== See also ==
- Ferricrete – stony particles conglomerated into rock by oxidized iron compounds from ground water
- Oxisol – Soil type known for occurring in tropical rain forests
- Plinthosol – Iron-rich soil type
