= Inverted relief =

Landscape features that have reversed their elevation relative to other features

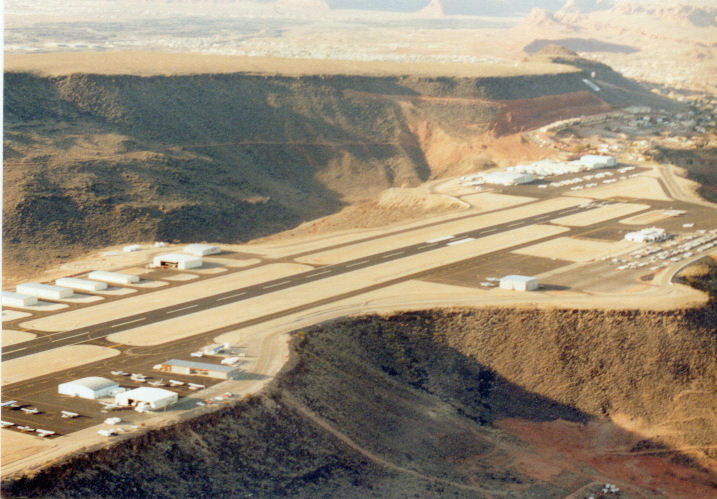
Inverted relief at former St. George Municipal Airport, Utah. The lava plateau upon which the airport was built once filled the bottom of a valley.

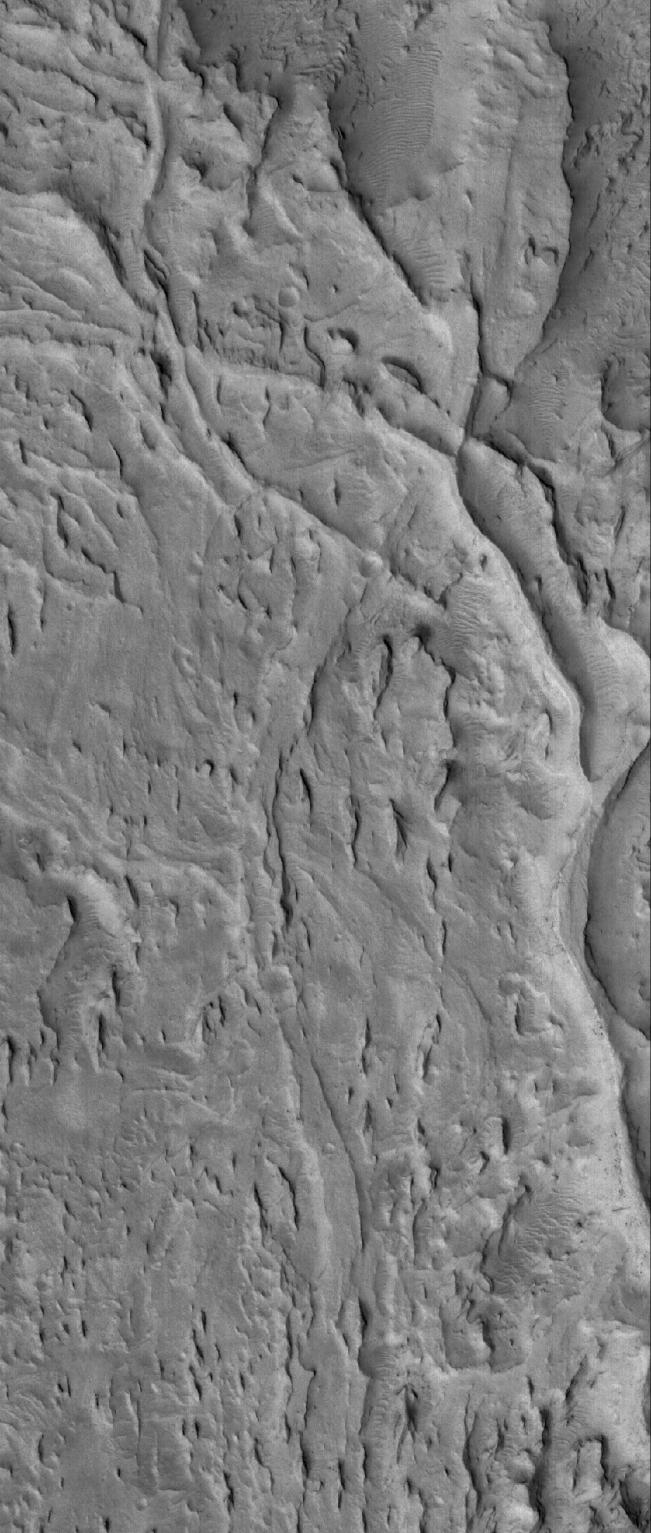
Inverted channels on Mars. These curved and crisscrossing ridges in the Aeolis region were once channels in a sediment fan. The channels were more resistant to wind erosion than the surrounding materials, so now they are left standing as ridges rather than valleys. Illumination is from the left.

Inverted relief, inverted topography, or topographic inversion refers to landscape features that have reversed their elevation relative to other features. It most often occurs when low areas of a landscape become filled with lava or sediment that hardens into material that is more resistant to erosion than the material that surrounds it. Differential erosion then removes the less resistant surrounding material, leaving behind the younger resistant material, which may then appear as a ridge where previously there was a valley. Terms such as "inverted valley" or "inverted channel" are used to describe such features. Inverted relief has been observed on the surfaces of other planets as well as on Earth. For example, well-documented inverted topographies have been discovered on Mars.

== Formation ==
Several processes can cause the floor of a depression to become more resistant to erosion than its surrounding slopes and uplands:

- First, coarse-grained sediment, such as gravel, accumulates in the depression, i.e., a stream valley or lake basin. Next, wind erosion removes fine-grained sediments in areas adjacent to the depression. This leaves behind the more resistant coarse-grained sediments as a hill or ridge, while the channel switches to a lower lying area.
- A fluvial valley might fill with volcanic material such as lava or welded tuff pouring into it. This would resist erosion while the surrounding surface is eroded away to create a ridge.
- Cementation of underlying sediments by minerals dissolved in water may occur in a depression. On Earth, this often happens in stream valleys as the result of the formation of duricrusts, i.e., silcrete or ferricrete, by pedogenesis. Minerals for cementation can come from groundwater. It is thought that a low point like a valley focuses groundflow, so more water and cements move into it, and this results in a greater degree of cementation. Again, the cemented sediments would resist erosion while the surrounding terrain is eroded away to create a ridge or hill.
- Erosion of the resistant upper strata of the anticlines of a folded region, exposing less resistant underlying strata, which then erode relatively rapidly leaving the syncline as the top of a mesa or ridge.

== An example ==
A classic example of inverted relief is Table Mountain, Tuolumne County, California. Multiple lava flows filled an ancient fluvial valley that cut westward through the central Sierra Nevada range to the Central Valley about 10.5 million years ago. These Miocene lava flows filled this ancient river valley with a thick sequence of potassium-rich trachyandesite lavas that are significantly more resistant to erosion than the Mesozoic siltstone and other rock in which the valley was cut. Thus, subsequent differential erosion left these volcanic rocks as a sinuous ridge, which now stands well above landscape underlain by more deeply eroded Mesozoic rocks.

Possible evolution of the Cape Town landscape: The nearly horizontal Table Mountain sandstones represent the trough and the steeply dipping sandstones of the same formations of the Hottentots Holland Mountains to the east the limb of a large fold that has since eroded away to expose the underlying shale. Thus the modern landscape may represent an inverted version of an earlier landscape (dashed lines) characterised by a large mountain where the Cape Flats are now. (after Compton 2004)

Another example is Table Mountain, Cape Town, where the original high ridges of resistant quartzitic sandstone of the Cape Fold Belt were eroded away first, exposing less resistant rock, which eroded faster, leaving the original valley bottom at the top of the residual mountain.

== On Mars ==
Inverted relief in the form of sinuous and meandering ridges, which are indicative of ancient, inverted fluvial channels, is argued to be evidence of water channels on the Martian surface in the past. An example is Miyamoto Crater, which was proposed in 2010 as a potential location to be searched for evidence of life on Mars.

Other examples are shown in the photographs below.

=== Inverted terrain in Aeolis quadrangle ===
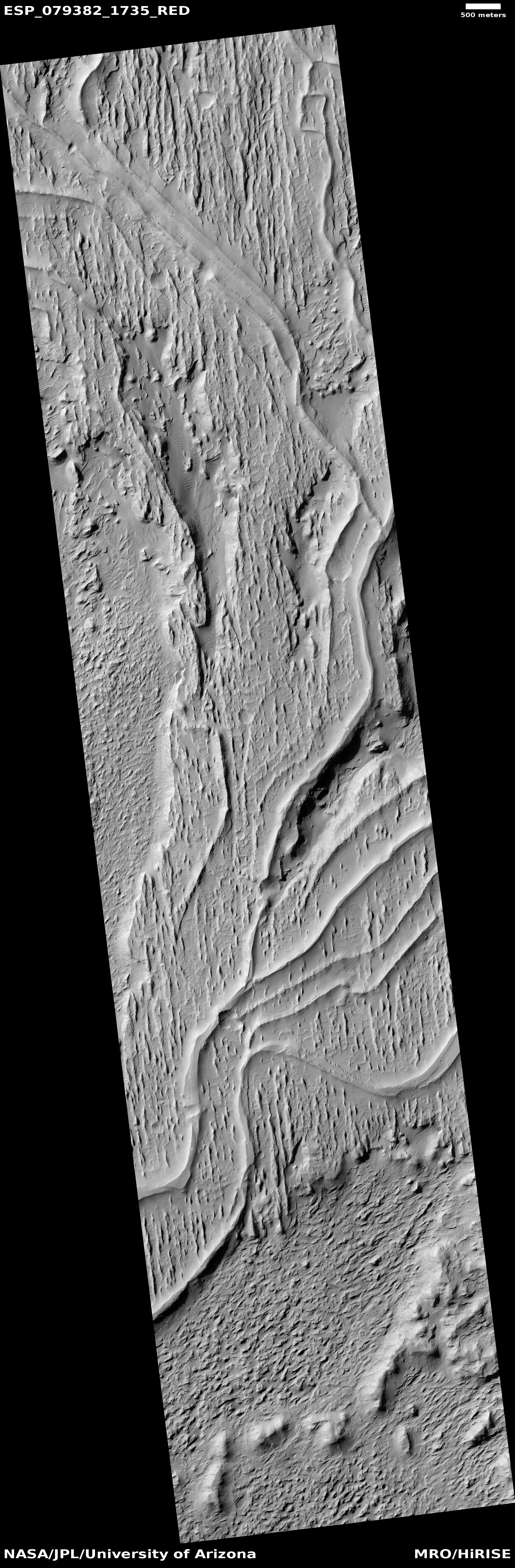
Inverted channels in Aleolis Planum Inverted channels may have formed when the area was buried and then later eroded. The former channels then appear above the surface because they are more resistant to erosion. Perhaps they accumulated larger rocks then the surroundings.

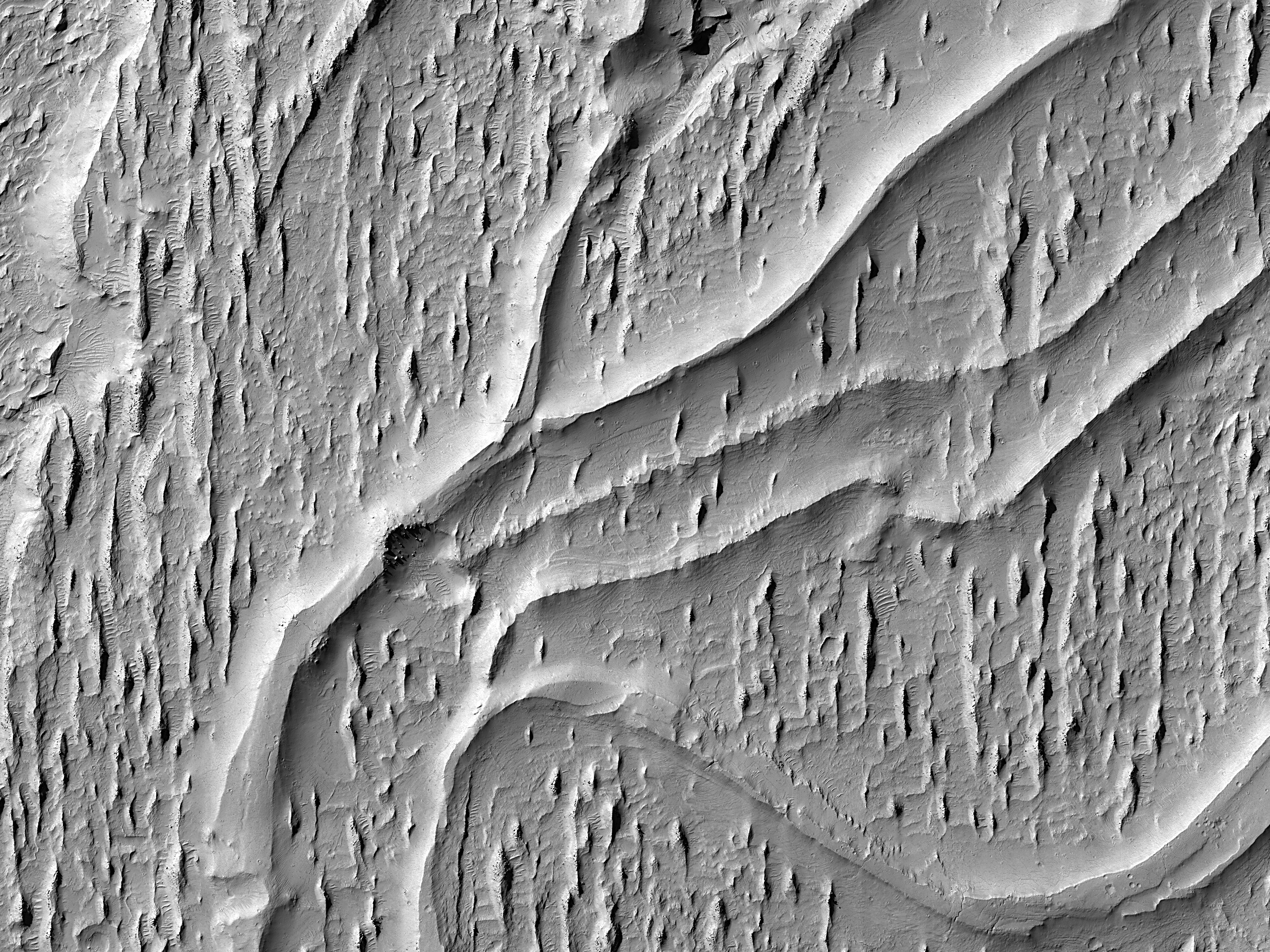
Close view of inverted channels. Note that some are flat on top.

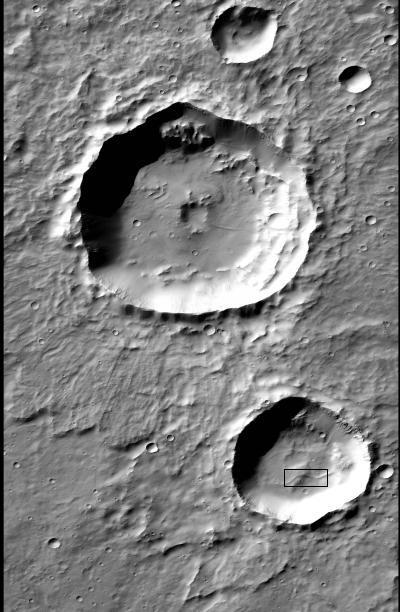
CTX image of craters in Aeolis quadrangle with black box in the large crater at lower right showing location of next image.

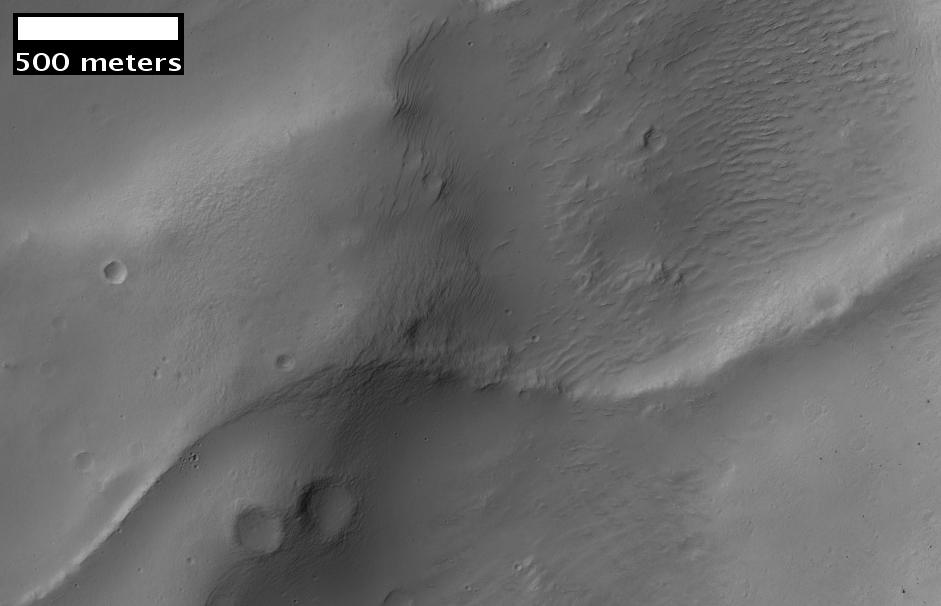
Image from previous photo of a curved ridge that may be an old stream that has become inverted. Illumination is from the NW. Image taken with HiRISE under the HiWish program.

Meandering Ridges that are probably inverted stream channels. Illumination is from the NW. Image taken with HiRISE.

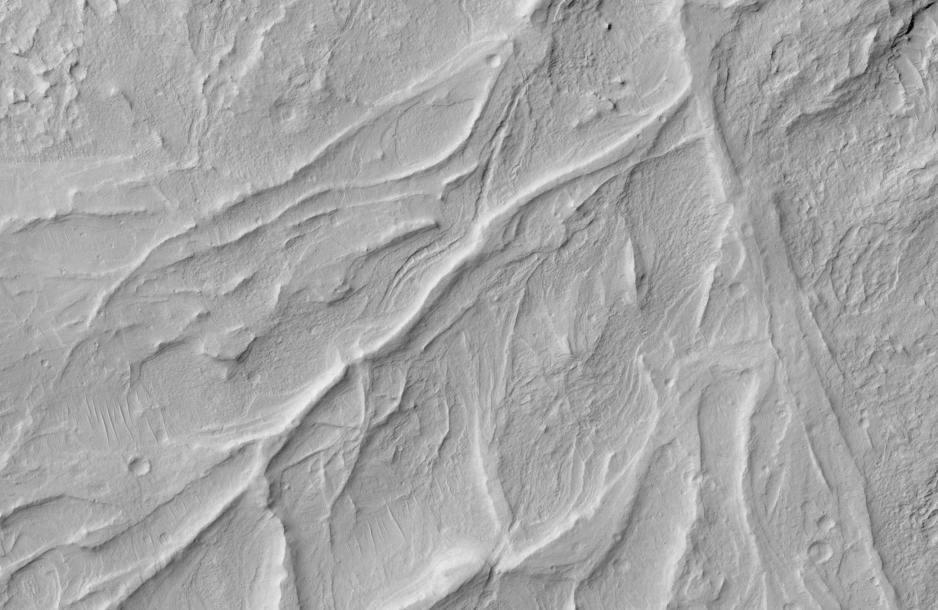
Sinuous Ridges within a branching fan in lower member of Medusae Fossae Formation, as seen by HiRISE. Illumination is from the NW.

=== Inverted terrain in Syrtis Major quadrangle ===
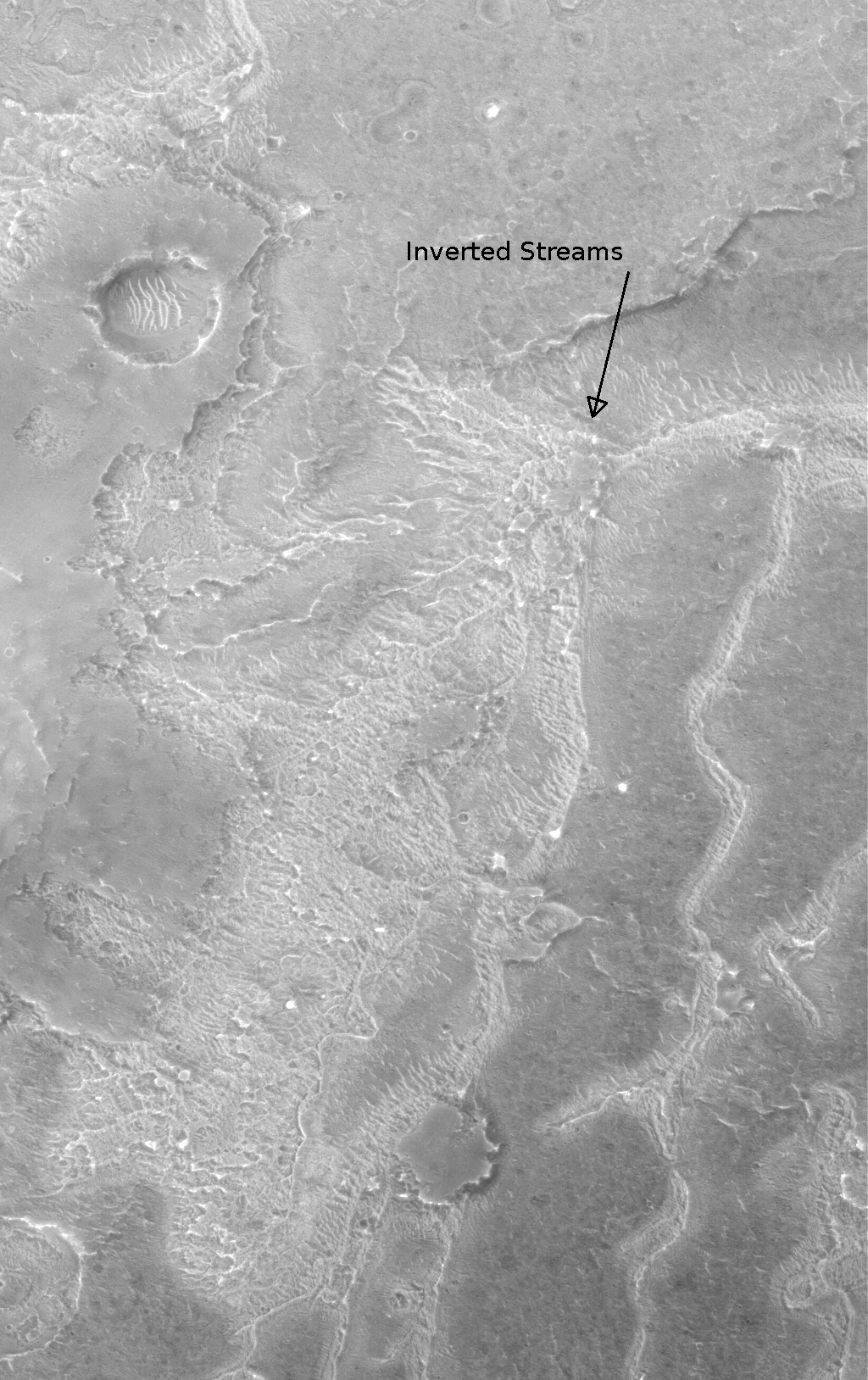
Inverted Streams near Juventae Chasma, Syrtis Major quadrangle, as seen by Mars Global Surveyor. These streams begin at the top of a ridge then run together.

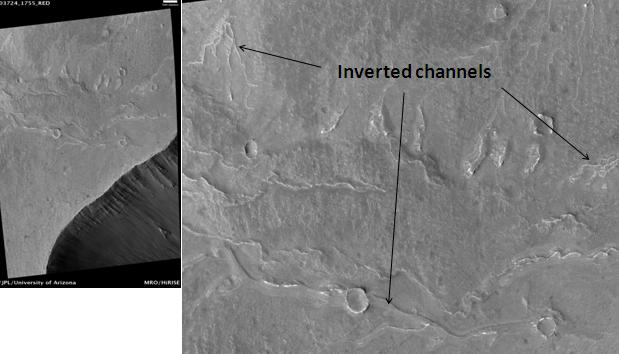
Inverted Channels near Juventae Chasma, as seen by HiRISE. Channels were once regular stream channels. Image in Coprates quadrangle. Scale bar is 500 meters long.

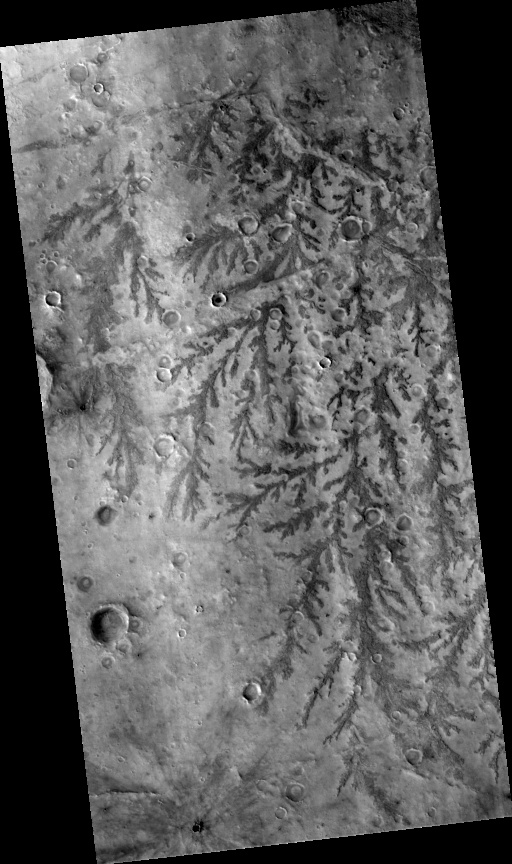
Inverted Channel with many branches in Syrtis Major quadrangle.

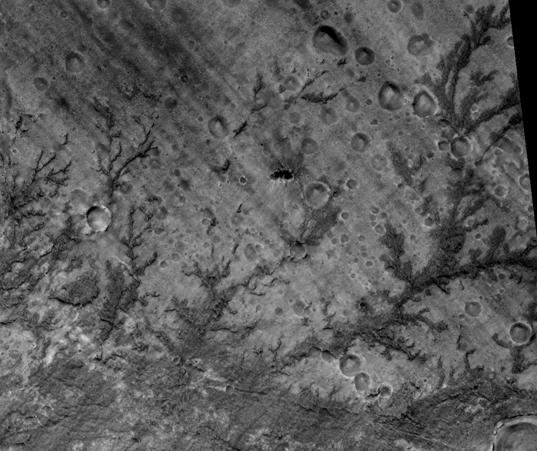
Inverted Stream Channels in Antoniadi Crater, as seen by HiRISE.

=== Inverted terrain in Margaritifer Sinus quadrangle ===
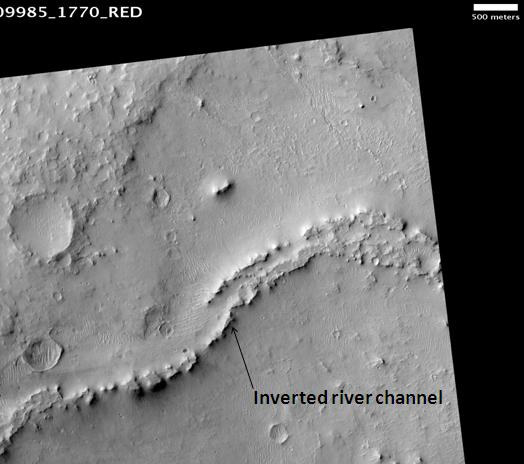
Inverted Channel in Miyamoto Crater, Margaritifer Sinus quadrangle, as seen by HiRISE. Illumination is from the NW. The scale bar is 500 meters long.

CTX context image for next image that was taken with HiRISE. Note long ridge going across image is probably an old stream. Box indicates area for HiRISE image.

Example of inverted terrain in Parana Valles region, as seen by HiRISE under the HiWish program. Illumination is from the NW.

=== Inverted terrain in Amazonis quadrangle ===
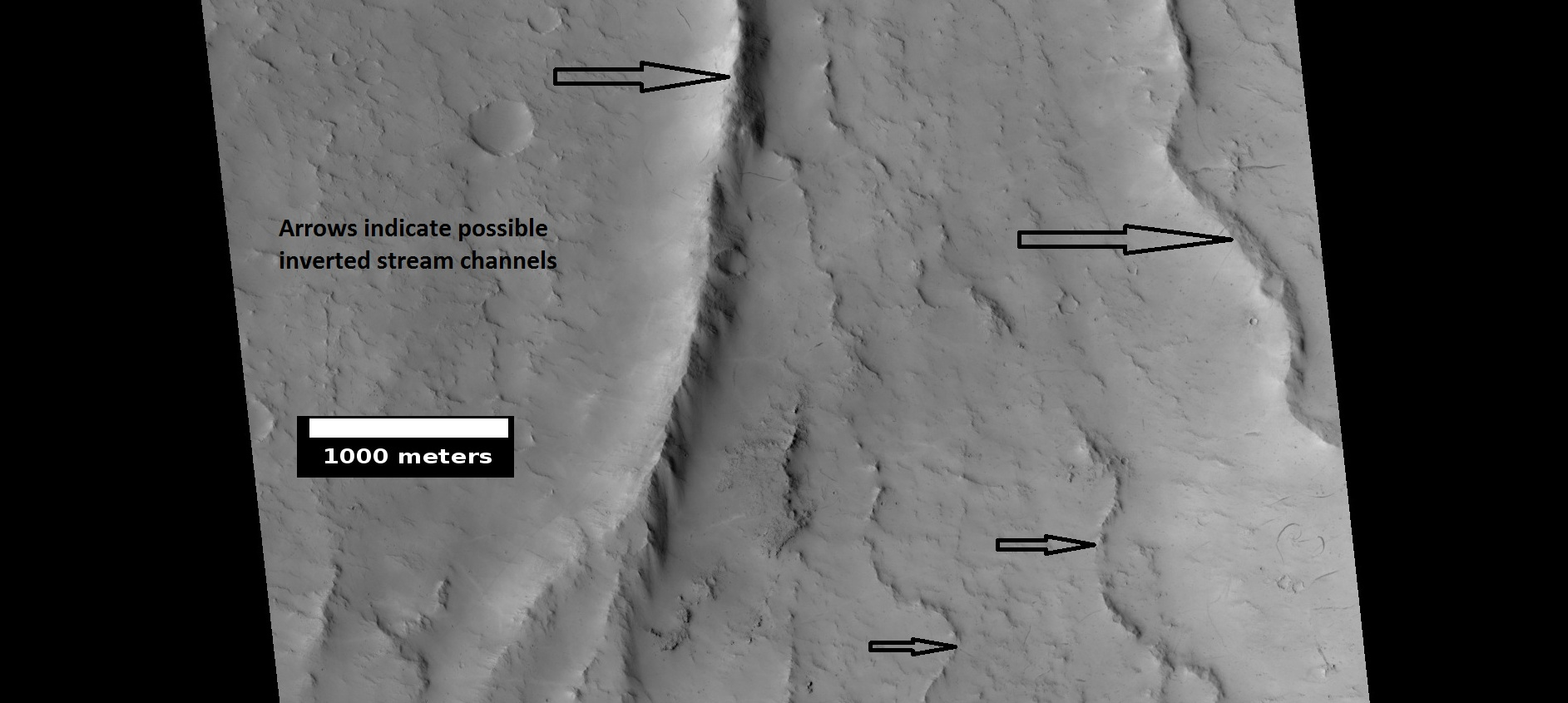
Possible inverted stream channels, Amazonis quadrangle, as seen by HiRISE under HiWish program. The ridges were probably once stream valleys that have become full of sediment and cemented. So, they became hardened against erosion which removed surrounding material. Illumination is from the left (west).

== See also ==
Exhumed river channel
