= Table Mountain (Tuolumne County, California) =

Series of flat-topped hills in California

- Location within California

Highest point
- Elevation: 1,100 to 2,000 ft (340 to 610 m)
- Coordinates: 37°58′59″N 120°26′04″W

Geography
- Location: Tuolumne County, California, U.S.
- Parent range: Sierra Nevada
- Topo map: USGS Tuolumne

Table Mountain is a narrow, 18 mi (29 km)-long, sinuous, flat-topped ridge separated by erosional saddles into a series of mesas that extend from Lake Tulloch to just west of Columbia, California in Tuolumne County, California. It is just over 1,100 ft (340 m) in elevation at its southern end and just over 2,000 ft (610 m) in elevation at its northern end. Its flat top is part of a stack of multiple 80 mi (130 km)-long lava flows that have been eroded to form a series of mesas that extend from Knights Ferry to Sonora, California. Its crest varies in width from a narrow ridge to over 1,100 ft (340 m) wide. It parallels the adjacent Stanislaus River.

== Geology ==
The lava flows that form the sinuous flat-topped mesas of Table Mountain in Tuolumne County belong to a geologic formation known as the Table Mountain Latite. Within the region of Table Mountain, the Table Mountain Latite is mapped as a part of the Mehrten Formation. Further north, it is considered part of a sequence of volcanic strata known as the Stanislaus Group. The Table Mountain Latite consists of high-potassium trachyandesite lavas. During the Pliocene, circa 10.4 Ma, these lavas were likely erupted from the Little Walker Volcanic Center near Sonora Pass. They flowed more than 80 mi (130 km) down a palaeo-Stanislaus River channel, known as the Cataract Channel, and past Knights Ferry in the Sierra Nevada foothills. These lava flows filled the Cataract Channel and overflowed into parts of its floodplain. Before the creation of New Melones Lake and Lake Tulloch, the modern Stanislaus River occupied a deep gorge west of Table Mountain.

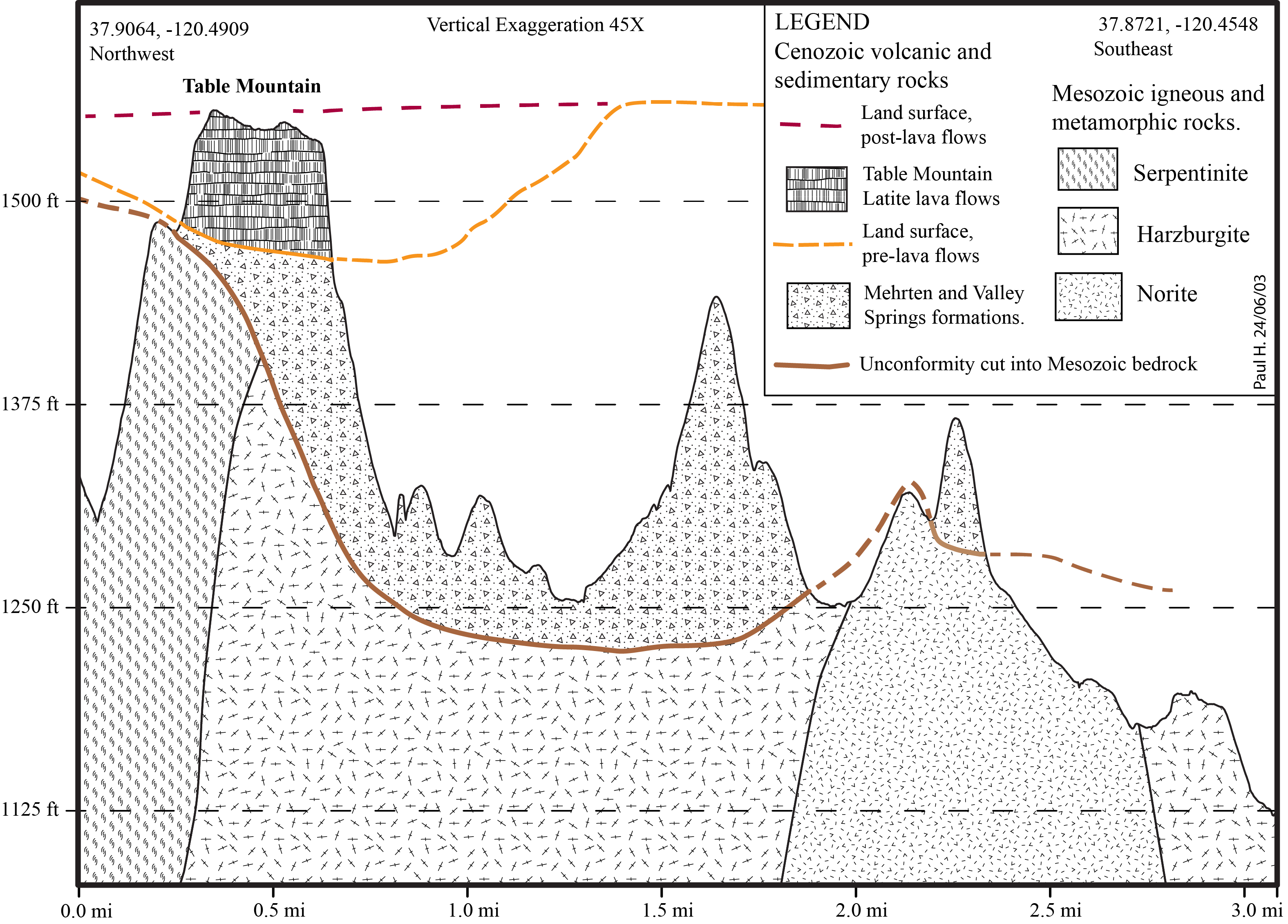
Geologic cross section showing geologic structure of and stratigraphy underlying Table Mountain, Tuolumne County, California.

Beneath the Table Mountain Latite and forming the bulk of Table Mountain are andesitic mudflows and conglomerates of the Mehrten Formation. They consist predominantly of debris flow deposits (interpreted as volcanic lahars), and fluvial conglomerates, lithic sandstones, and siltstones deposited by rivers which flowed westward across the Table Mountain region.

Underlying the Mehrten Formation is the much thinner Valley Springs Formation. It consists of sandstone, siltstone and conglomerate interbedded with altered volcanic ashflow tuffs. The Valley Springs Formation represents sediments that were deposited by westward flowing river systems and intermittent channelized volcanic ashflows (pyroclastic flows) within the same drainage system.

The sediments of the Mehrten and Valley Springs formations once formed a thick blanket of volcanoclastic sediments which almost completely buried the pre-Oligocene topography and river valleys of this region. At the end of their deposition, the only pre-Cenozoic, basement rocks exposed in this region were ridges of resistant greenstone (a type of mafic metavolcanic rock) and a few high summits of the Sierra Nevada's middle slopes. Further north and closer to their source areas, the Mehrten and Valley Springs formations consist of volcanic and volcanoclastic deposits that have been divided into several stratigraphic units, e.g. the Relief Peak Formation, Stanislaus Group, etc., based on their age and source volcanic center.

Lying buried beneath the volcanoclastic sediments of the Mehrten and Valley Springs formations within the Table Mountain region are paleovalleys cut into pre-Cenozoic bedrock. These paleovalleys are filled with Eocene, prevolcanic, quartz-rich, gravelly, gold-bearing stream deposits. Since the early days of gold mining in the Sierra Nevada, these gravelly sediments have been known as the Auriferous gravels. Although this name is inappropriate because gold occurs in youngers gravels of younger age and the rules of naming stratigraphic rock units, no one has yet suggested a better name for the Auriferous gravels. The Auriferous gravels are distinct from the younger Cenozoic deposits in that they lack Cenozoic volcanic material. By 1911, Lindgren had largely reconstructed the courses of these ancient river valleys and systems cut into basement rocks and filled with the gold-bearing Auriferous gravels. Where exposed in modern valleys these channels have been extensively mined for gold by hydraulic mining and underground they have been thoroughly explored by drift mining. Although exceedingly rich in placer gold, they have been completely exhausted as a source of commercial placer gold in Table Mountain area.

Since the lava flows of the Table Mountain Latite filled the Cataract Channel circa 10.4 Ma, erosion has stripped the Mehrten and Valley Springs formations from the Table Mountain region where they were not covered and protected by the lava flows of the Table Mountain Latite. As a result, the prevolcanic unconformity lying at the base of the Mehrten and Valley Springs formations has been exhumed and is now exposed as the modern rolling topography adjacent to Table Mountain.

== Ecology ==
A variety of flora and fauna are found on Table Mountain. In the spring, many wildflowers can be found atop the mountain including several species of lupine and the yellow mariposa lily, Calochortus luteus. Vernal pools form on the flat top after heavy winter and spring rains, providing habitat for many uncommon plant and animal species. The harsh conditions found on top of Table Mountain generally prevent invasive plants from surviving, resulting in a landscape which is composed primarily of native plants. White-throated swifts nest on the cliff faces that flank the mountain.

== See also ==
- Inverted relief
