= Sơn Tây =

Sơn Tây may refer to several places in Vietnam, including:

- Sơn Tây, Hanoi: a ward in the former Sơn Tây town
- Sơn Tây, Hà Tĩnh: a commune in the former Hương Sơn district
- Sơn Tây, Quảng Ngãi: a commune in the former Sơn Tây district
- Sơn Tây Province: a former province in North Vietnam, dissolved in 1965 and became part of Hà Tây province
  - Citadel of Sơn Tây: a fortification and provincial capital, site of the Sơn Tây campaign
- Sơn Tây (town): a former district-level town of Hanoi, dissolved in 2025 as part of the 2025 Vietnamese administrative reform
- Sơn Tây district: a former district of Quảng Ngãi province, dissolved in 2025 as part of the 2025 Vietnamese administrative reform
