= Duricrust =

Type of surface soil layer

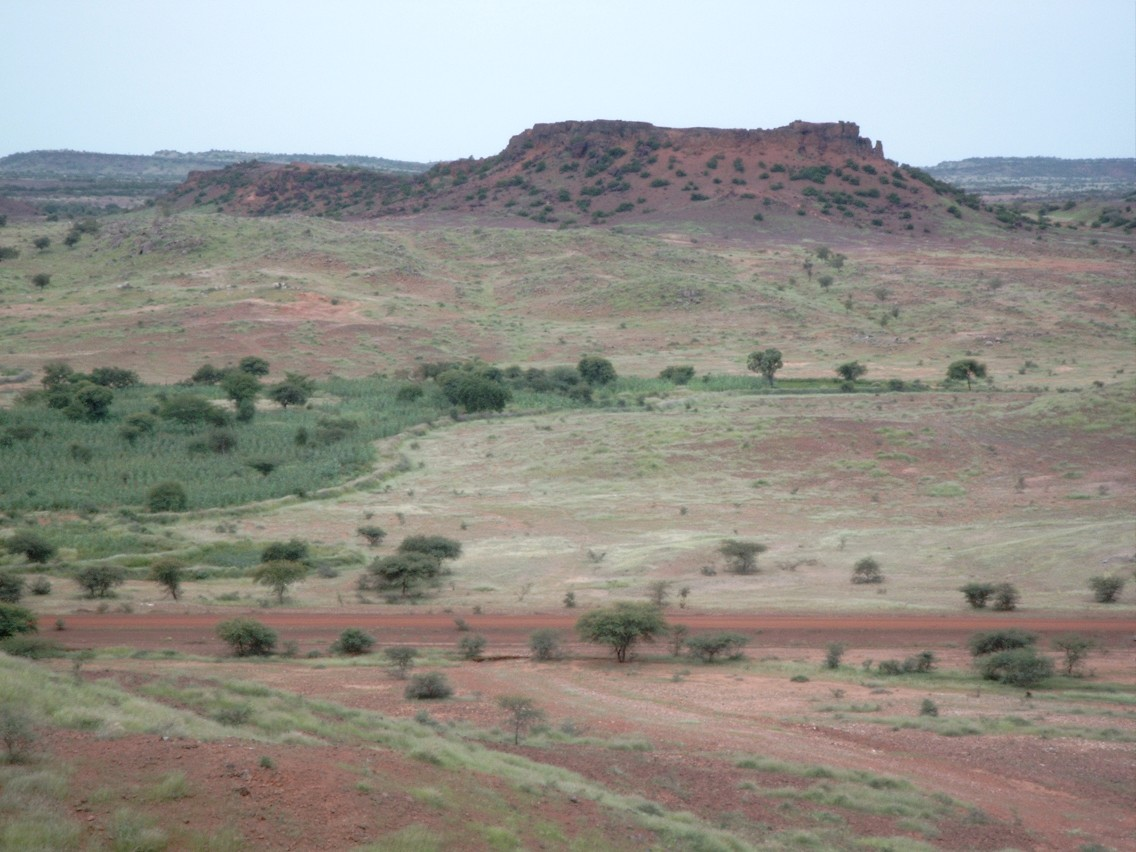
- A duricrust inselberg near Dori, Burkina Faso
- Key minerals: Soluble minerals
- Climate: Arid
- Primary: Various
- Secondary: Various

Duricrust is a hard layer on or near the surface of soil. Duricrusts can range in thickness from a few millimeters or centimeters to several meters.

It is a general term (not to be confused with duripan) for a zone of chemical precipitation and hardening formed at or near the surface of sedimentary bodies through pedogenic or non-pedogenic processes. It is typically formed by the accumulation of soluble minerals deposited by mineral-bearing waters that move upward, downward, or laterally by capillary action. It is commonly assisted in arid settings by evaporation. There are different types of duricrusts, each distinguished by a dominant mineralogy. For example, ferricrete (laterite) is dominated by sesquioxides of iron; alcrete (bauxite) is dominated by sesquioxides of aluminum; silcrete by silica; calcrete (caliche) by calcium carbonate, and gypcrete (gypcrust) by gypsum.

Duricrust is often studied during missions to Mars because it may help prove that the planet once had more water. Duricrust was found on Mars at the Viking 2 landing site, and a similar structure, nicknamed "Snow Queen", was found under the Phoenix landing site. Phoenix's duricrust was later confirmed to be water-based.
