= Silcrete =

Type of soil layer

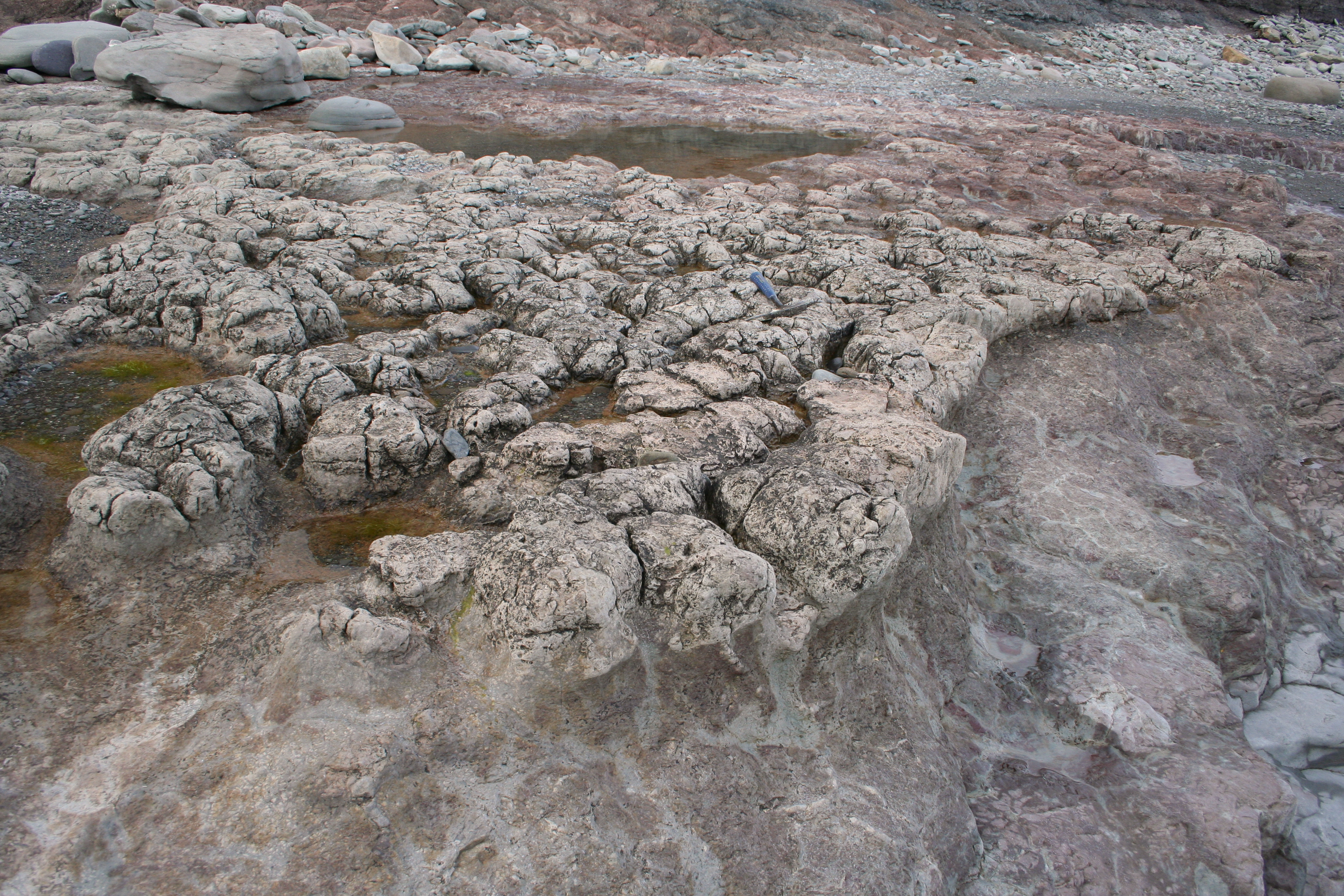
Silcrete (siliceous paleosol) in the Waddens Cove Formation (formed during the Pennsylvanian), Sydney Basin, Nova Scotia

Silcrete is an indurated (resists crumbling or powdering) soil duricrust formed when surface soil, sand, and gravel are cemented by dissolved silica. The formation of silcrete is similar to that of calcrete, formed by calcium carbonate, and ferricrete, formed by iron oxide. It is a hard and resistant material, and though different in origin and nature, appears similar to quartzite. As a duricrust, there is potential for preservation of root structures as trace fossils.

There are two types of silcrete that form in nature microcrystalline quartz and lacustrine silcretes. The microcrystalline forms in arid environments with increased levels of pH and are characterized by alterations of silicate cappings. These cappings are related to translocation of fine material and the silicification of those materials which occurs in phreatic fluctuations causing silica precipitation. Because of this formation the deposits in microcrystalline quartz silcrete have regular fine grained bands that appear in the rock. These types of silcretes form in environments that transition from wet to dry conditions. Lacustrine silcretes form in environments that have decreases in pH. They contain opal precipitation due to changes in pore fluid salinity these changes result in irregular opal nodules forming in the rock formation. This collection of opal nodules that form in this type of silcrete create irregular deposits of opal in the rock formation during the silicification process. It is most common for lacustrine silcretes to form in places that go from dry to wet conditions.

Silcrete is common in the arid regions of Australia and Africa often forming the resistant cap rock on features such as the breakaways of the Stuart Range of South Australia. Silcrete can be found at a lesser extent throughout the world especially England (e.g. Hertfordshire puddingstone and sarsen stone), and France. In the Great Plains of the United States, polished silcrete cobbles are locally common on the surface and in river gravels east of the outcrops of the Ogallala Formation.

== Human use ==
In Australia, silcrete was widely used by Aboriginal people for stone tool manufacture, and as such, it was a tradeable commodity, and silcrete tools can be found in areas that have no silcrete groundmass at all, similar to the European use of flint.

Tools made out of silcrete which has not been heat treated are difficult to make with flintknapping techniques. It is widely believed by stone tool experts that the technology to treat silcrete by burying under a hot fire was known 25,000 years ago in Europe. Heating changes the stone structure making it more easily flaked. This process may have been the first use of so-called pyrotechnology by early mankind.

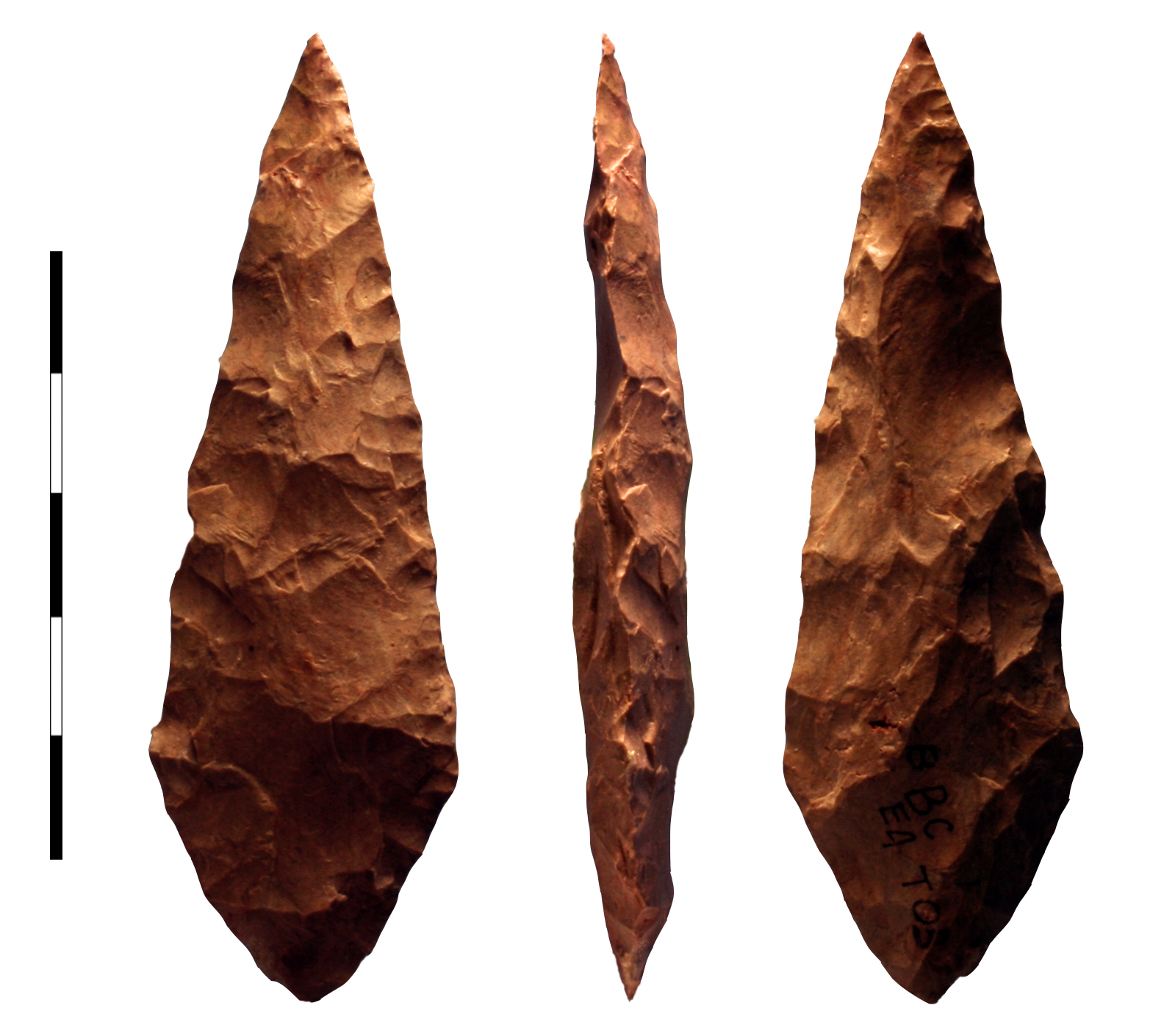
Bifacial silcrete point from Blombos Cave, South Africa, Middle Stone Age (71,000 BCE) (scale bar = 5cm)

In South Africa at Pinnacle Point researchers have determined that two types of silcrete tools were developed between 60,000 and 80,000 years ago and used the heat treatment technique. There is evidence to suggest the technique may have been known as early as 164,000 years ago.

The peoples of the African Middle Stone Age (MSA) showed a preference for silcrete tools, sourcing the material from up to 200 km to use in place of more accessible quartz and quartzite. MSA quarries have recently been found in Botswana south of the Okavango Delta. Evidence was found that raw silcrete blanks and blocks were transported prior to heat treating during the MSA. The geochemical signatures of the fragments can be used to identify where many of the individual pieces were quarried.

The Boomplaas Cave site also in South Africa houses silcrete lithics that have shown evidence of heat treatment, this application of heat allowing for the production of lithics via the Levallois technique; a method where flakes are chipped off of the core to create the desired tool. Similar sites to Boomplaas Cave also show evidence of silcrete microliths as well. The site itself, dates back to over 66,000 years ago. Further radiocarbon dating from this site shows that it had been occupied both before and after the Last Glacial Maximum.

The builders of Stonehenge in southern England used this stone for the Heel Stone and sarsen circle uprights. Avebury and many other megalithic monuments in southern England are also built with sarsen stones.

In the Great Plains of the United States, silcrete cobbles and boulders up to 16 kilograms (35 lb) of Neogene/early-Quaternary age are found on uplands bordering the Ogallala outcrop and were used as chipped tool stone as early as the Early Ceramic (ca. 400–1100 CE) Keith phase of the Woodland culture.

In a survey of Fishtail points from the Late Pleistocene of Uruguay, approximately 54% of the studied points were made of silcrete, far more than any other rock type, with silcrete tools being transferred hundreds of kilometres from their original outcrop.
