= Ferricrete =

Ferricrete layer in a Gulf Coastal Plain outcrop.

Ferricrete is a hard, erosion-resistant layer of sedimentary rock, usually conglomerate or breccia, that has been cemented into a duricrust by iron oxides. The iron oxide cements are derived from the oxidation of percolating solutions of iron salts. Ferricretes form at or near the land surface and may contain non-local sediments that have been transported from outside the immediate area of the deposit.

The name is a combination of ferruginous and concrete. Synonyms include ferruginous duricrust, hardpan and ironpan.

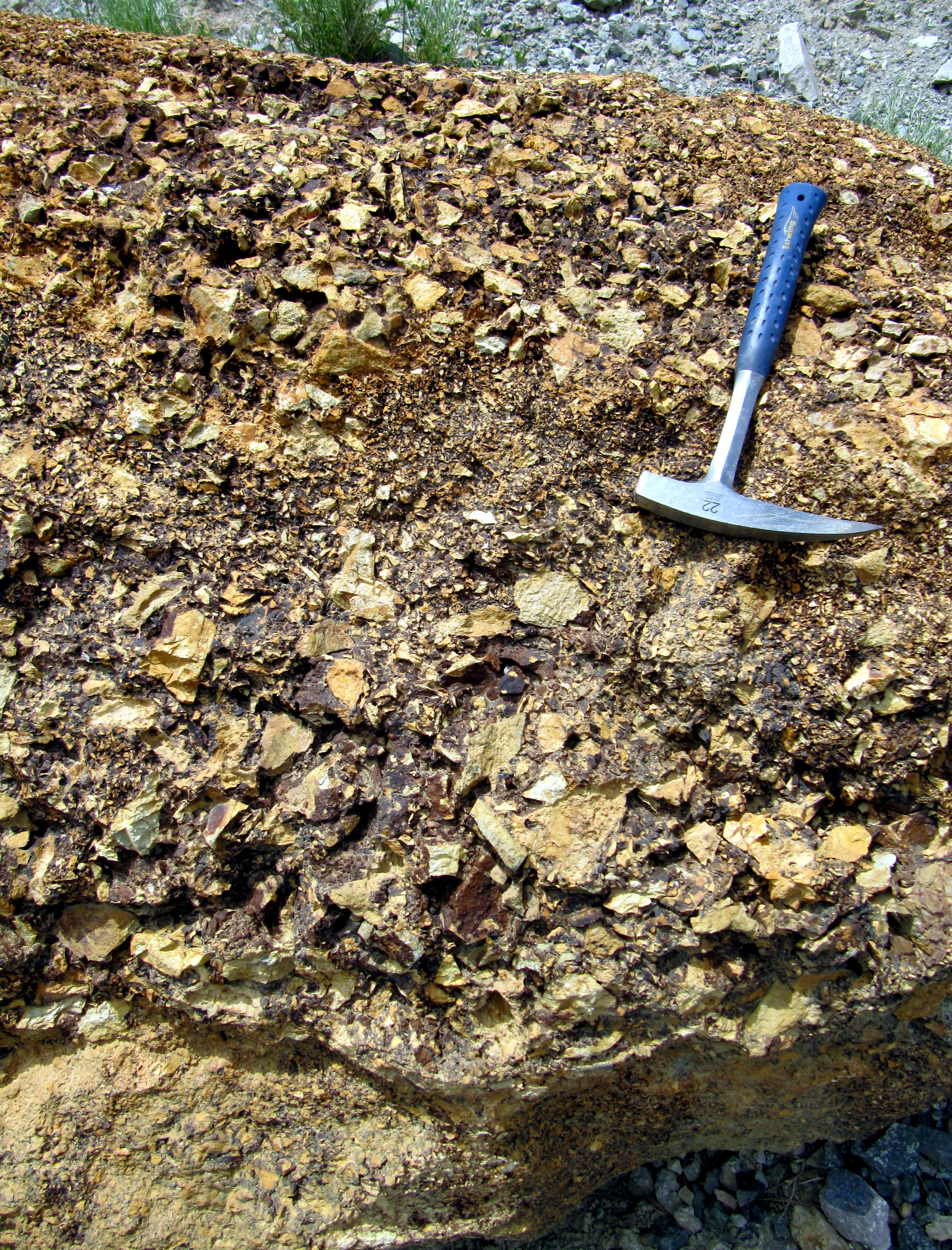
This boulder of ferricrete near Questa, New Mexico, is an iron oxide-cemented colluvial breccia.

Ferricrete deposits along the Animas River watershed in Colorado have been classified as:

- alluvial iron oxyhydroxide-cemented conglomerates along old stream channels;
- colluvial iron oxyhydroxide-cemented, poorly sorted breccias with massive to minor layering subparallel to hillslopes;
- iron spring and bog deposits with few or no clasts, exhibiting fine, horizontal lamination; and
- manganocrete deposits with gray to black matrix containing abundant manganese oxide minerals.

Ferricrete also occurs in the United States in areas of the Gulf Coastal Plain and the Atlantic Coastal Plain, and in remote eastern areas of Australia and Western Australia.

Ferricrete is used widely in South Africa to create roads in rural areas. It is better known in these regions by its Afrikaans name "Koffieklip" (coffee stone).
