= Plain =

Expanse of land that is mostly flat

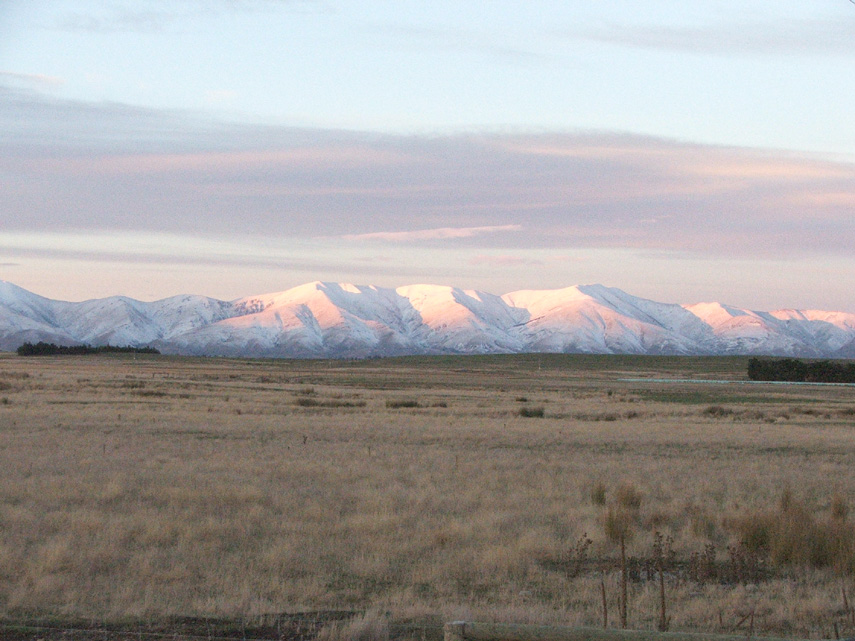
The Kakanui Range dominates the eastern horizon of the Maniototo Plain of New Zealand.

In geography, a plain, commonly known as flatland, is a flat expanse of land that generally has few rapid or steep changes in elevation. Natural vegetation in plains can include prairies/grasslands, forests, savanah, tundra, and desert biomes, among others. Plains occur as lowlands along valleys or at the base of mountains, as coastal plains, and as plateaus or uplands. Plains are one of the major landforms on earth, being present on all continents and covering more than one-third of the world's land area. Plains in many areas are important for agriculture. There are various types of plains, and biomes on them.

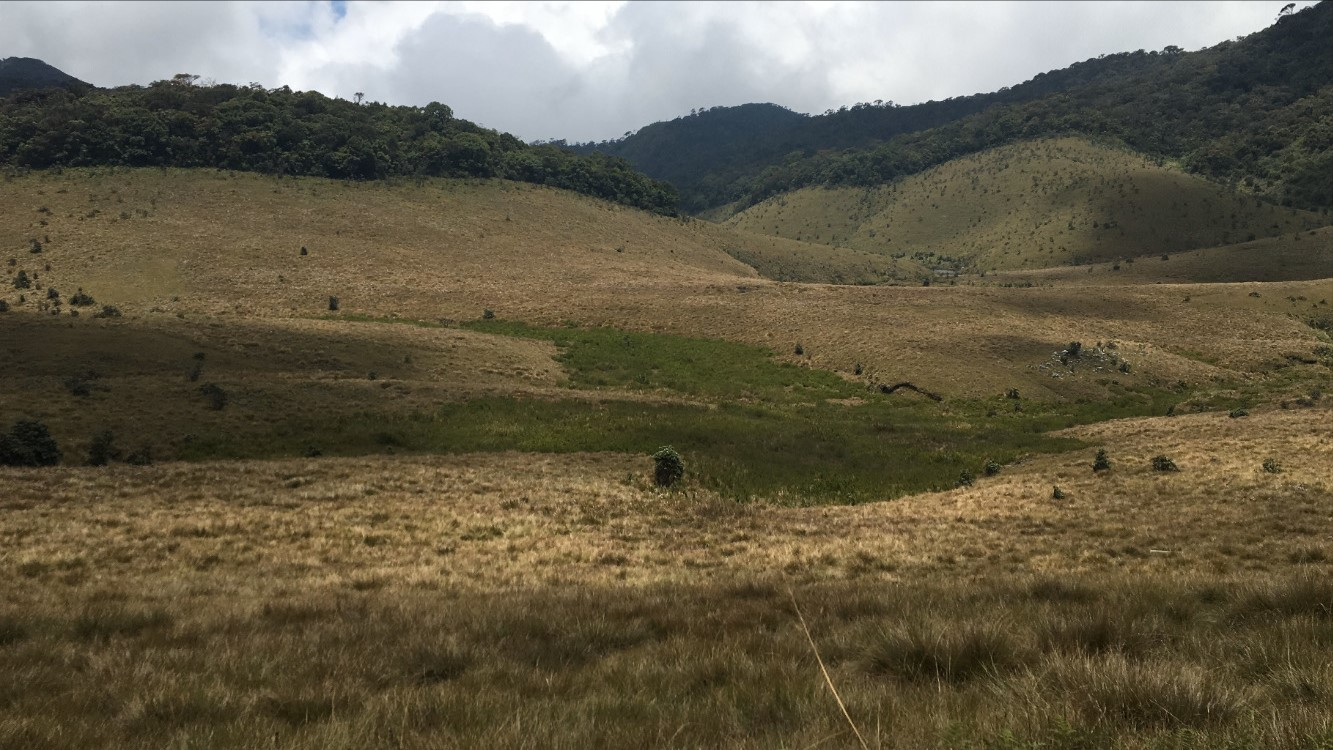
Montane plains as seen in Horton Plains in Sri Lanka

== Description ==
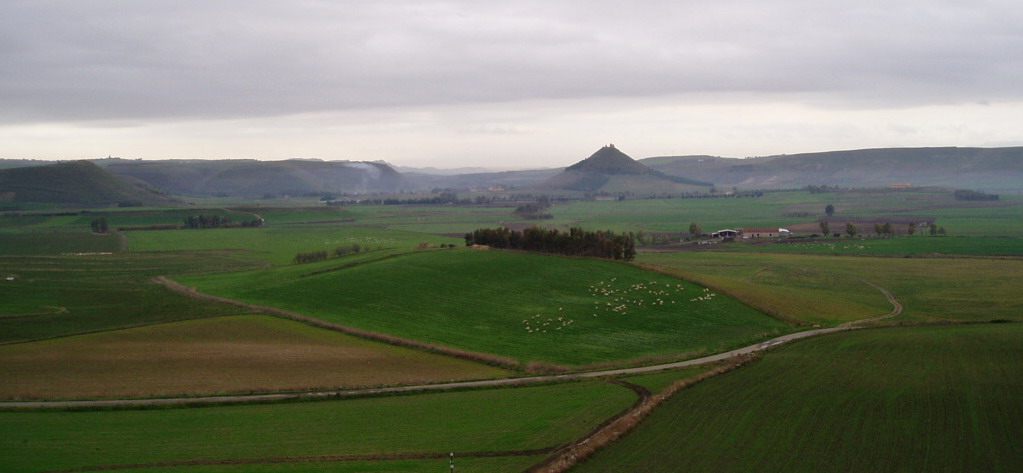
Plain of Campidano, Italy

A plain or flatland is a flat expanse of land with few rapid or steep changes in elevation. Plains occur as lowlands along valleys or at the base of mountains, as coastal plains, and as plateaus or uplands. Plains are one of the major landforms on earth, where they are present on all continents, and cover more than one-third of the world's land area.

In a valley, a plain is enclosed on two sides, but in other cases a plain may be delineated by a complete or partial ring of hills, by mountains, or by cliffs. Where a geological region contains more than one plain, they may be connected by a pass (sometimes termed a gap). Coastal plains mostly rise from sea level until they run into elevated features such as mountains or plateaus. Plains can be formed from flowing lava; from deposition of sediment by water, ice, or wind; or formed by erosion by the agents from hills or mountains.

Biomes on plains include grassland (temperate or subtropical), steppe (semi-arid), savannah (tropical) or tundra (polar). In a few instances, deserts may also be considered plains.

Plains in many areas are important for agriculture because where the soils were deposited as sediments they may be deep and fertile, and the flatness facilitates mechanization of crop production; or because they support grasslands which provide good grazing for livestock.

== Types of plain ==
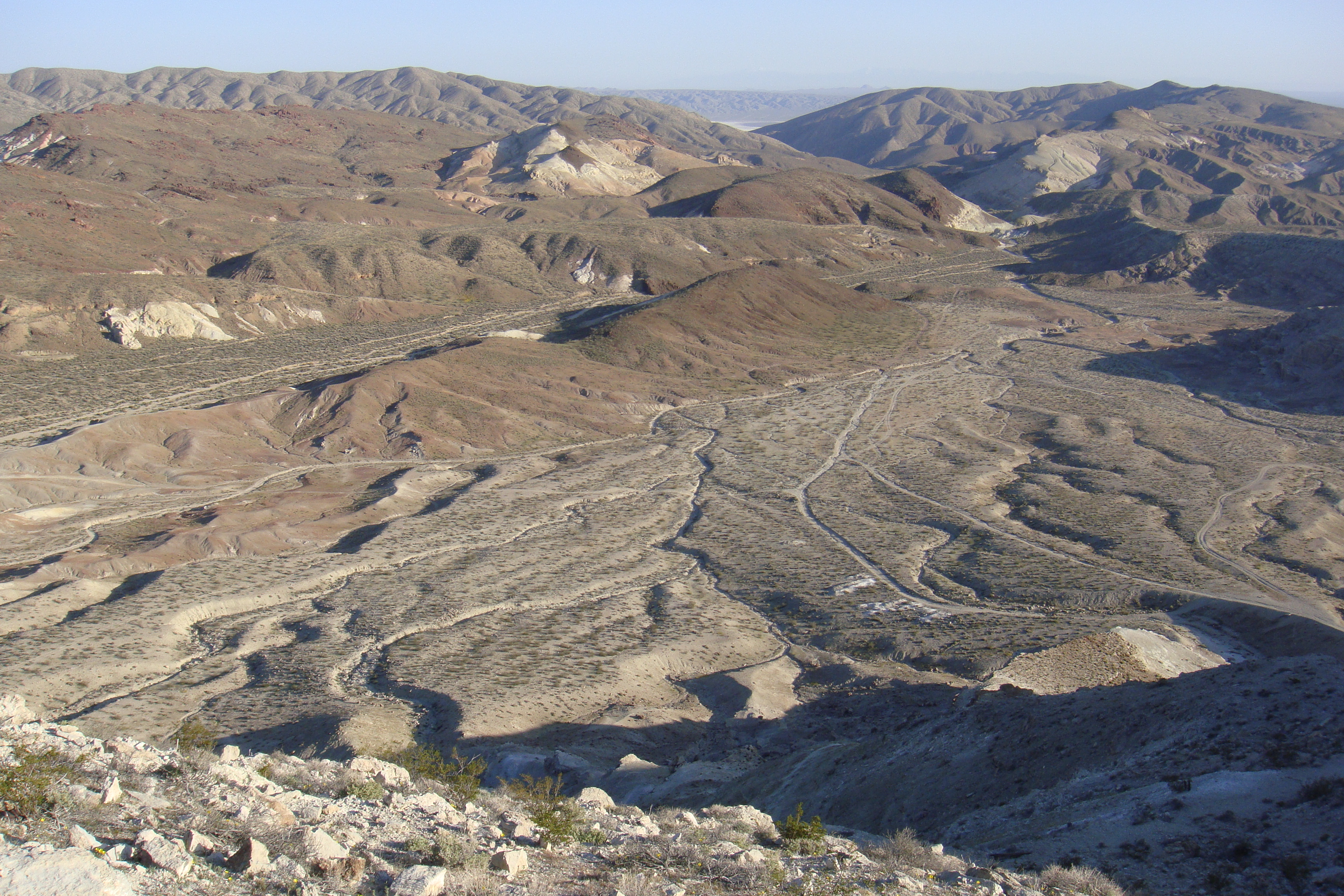
A small, incised alluvial plain from Red Rock Canyon State Park (California)

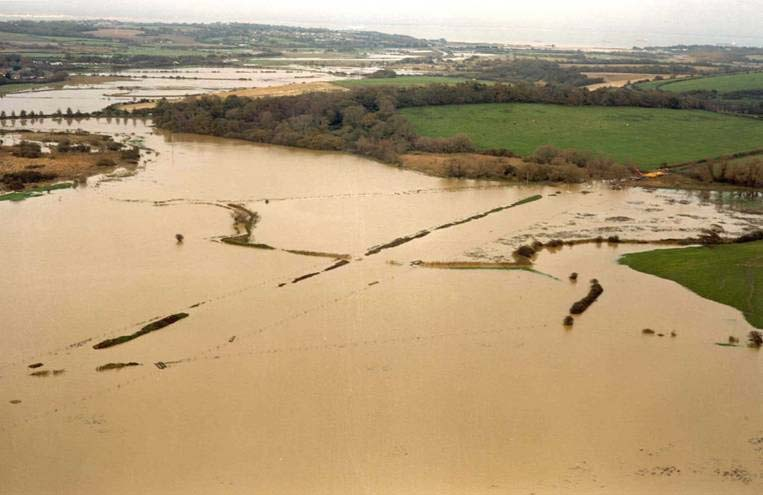
A flood plain in the Isle of Wight

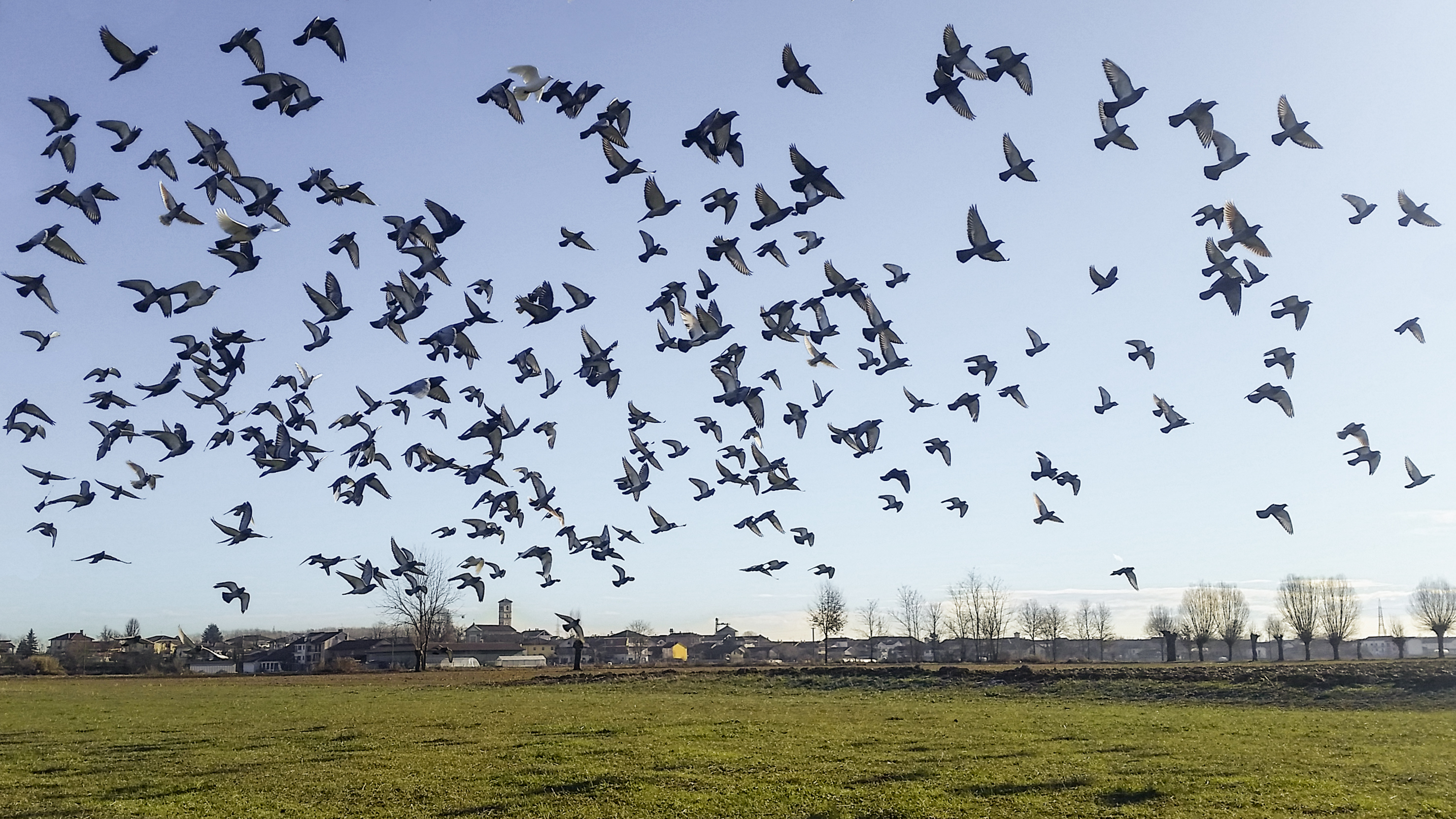
Po Valley, Carmagnola, countryside near the Po river, Italy

=== Depositional plains ===
The types of depositional plains include:

- Abyssal plains, flat or very gently sloping areas of the deep ocean basin.
- Planitia /pləˈnɪʃiə/, the Latin word for plain, is used in the naming of plains on extraterrestrial objects (planets and moons), such as Hellas Planitia on Mars or Sedna Planitia on Venus.
- Alluvial plains, which are formed by rivers and which may be one of these overlapping types:
  - Alluvial plains, formed over a long period of time by a river depositing sediment on their flood plains or beds, which become alluvial soil. The difference between a flood plain and an alluvial plain is: a flood plain represents areas experiencing flooding fairly regularly in the present or recently, whereas an alluvial plain includes areas where a flood plain is now and used to be, or areas which only experience flooding a few times a century.
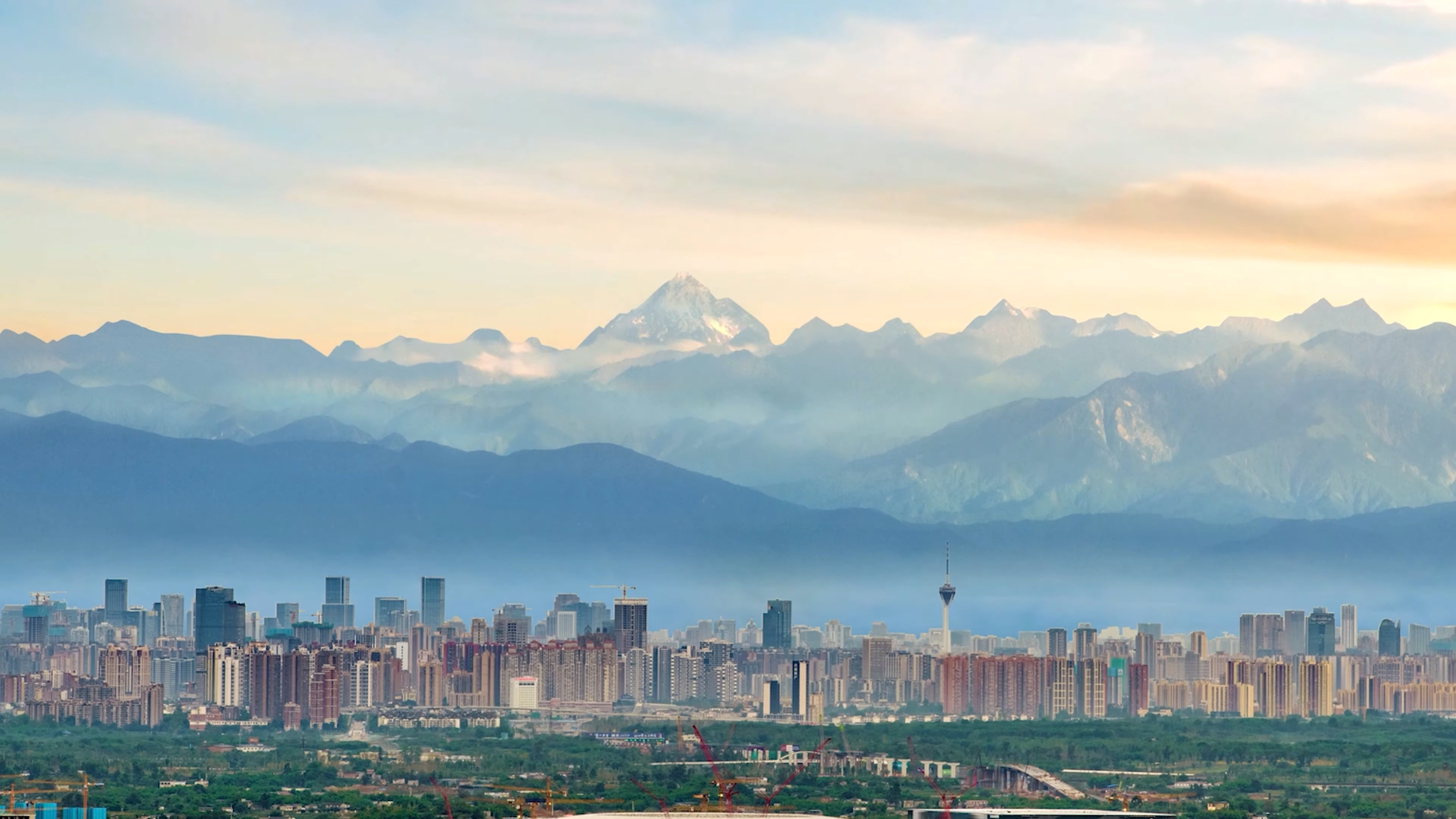
    Chengdu Plain, Sichuan
  - Flood plain, adjacent to a lake, river, stream, or wetland that experiences occasional or periodic flooding.
  - Scroll plain, a plain through which a river meanders with a very low gradient.
- Glacial plains, formed by the movement of glaciers under the force of gravity:
  - Outwash plain (also known as sandur; plural sandar), a glacial out-wash plain formed of sediments deposited by melt-water at the terminus of a glacier. Sandar consist mainly of stratified (layered and sorted) gravel and sand.
  - Till plains, plain of glacial till that form when a sheet of ice becomes detached from the main body of a glacier and melts in place depositing the sediments it carries. Till plains are composed of unsorted material (till) of all sizes.
- Lacustrine plains, plains that originally formed as the bed of a lake.
- Lava plains, formed by sheets of flowing lava.

=== Erosional plains ===
Erosional plains have been leveled by various agents of denudation such as running water, rivers, wind and glacier which wear out the rugged surface and smoothens them. Plain resulting from the action of these agents of denudation are called peneplains (almost plain) while plains formed from wind action are called pediplains.

=== Structural plains ===
Structural plains are relatively undisturbed horizontal surfaces of the Earth. They are structurally depressed areas of the world that make up some of the most extensive natural lowlands on the Earth's surface.

== Notable examples ==
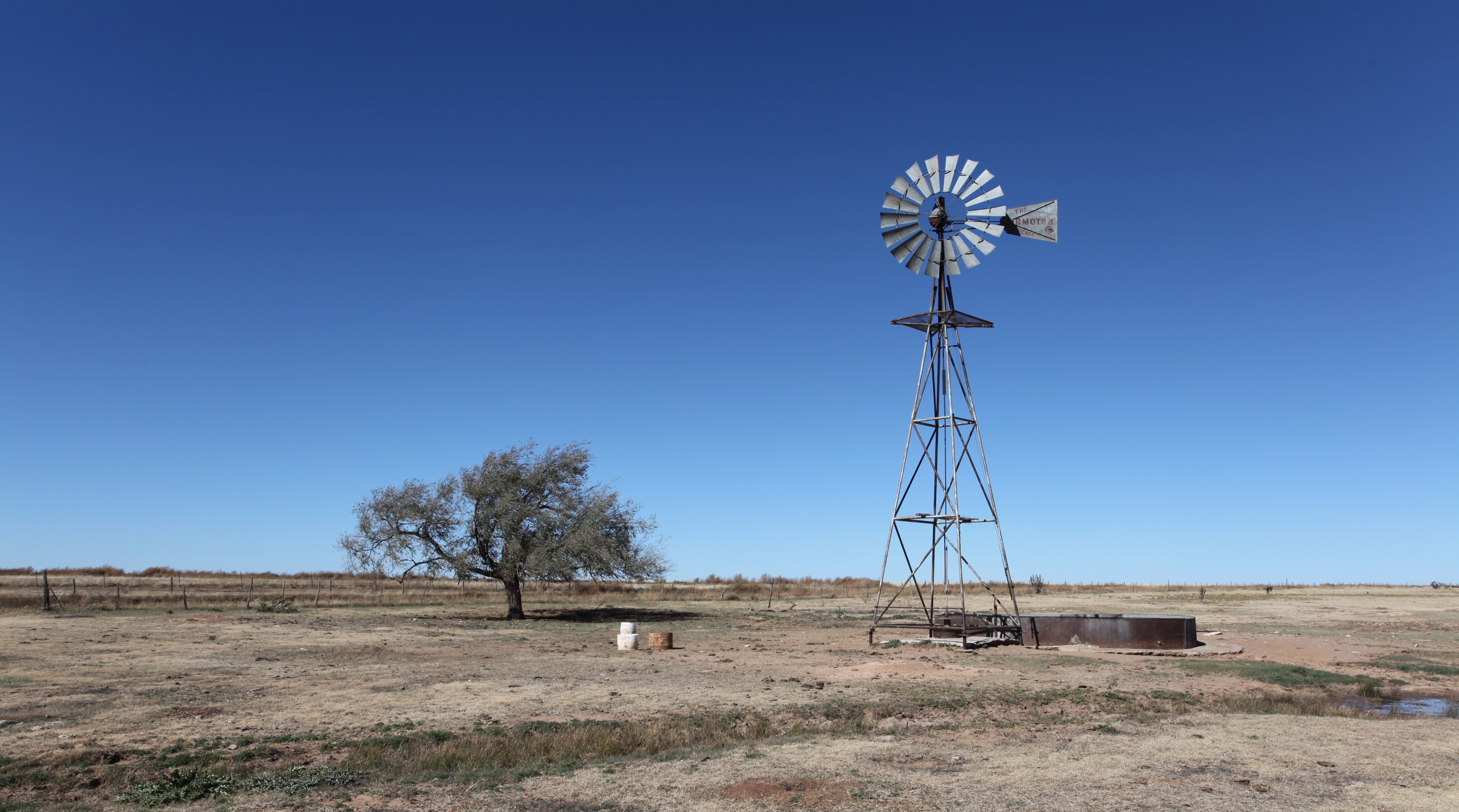
Curry County, eastern New Mexico, on the North American Great Plains

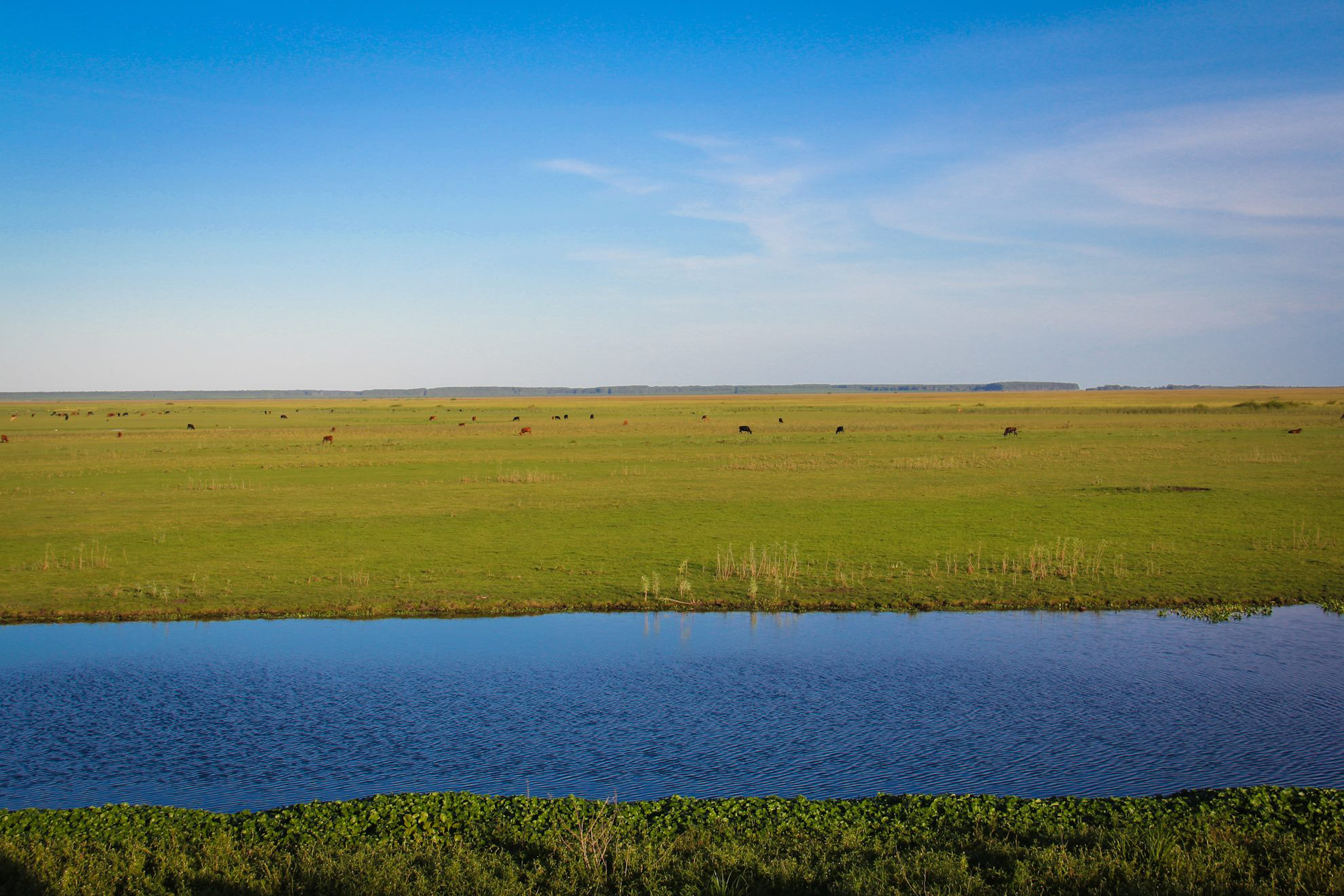
The Pampas are a huge area of fertile grasslands in the southeastern area of South America, bordering the Atlantic Ocean.

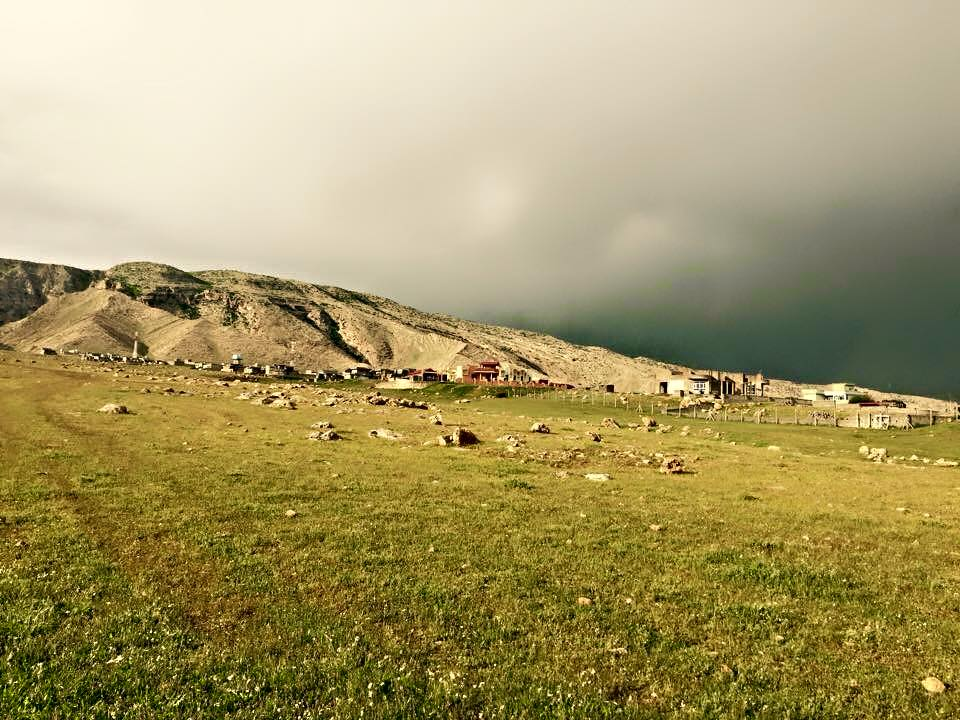
Nineveh Plains (Bozan, Iraq)

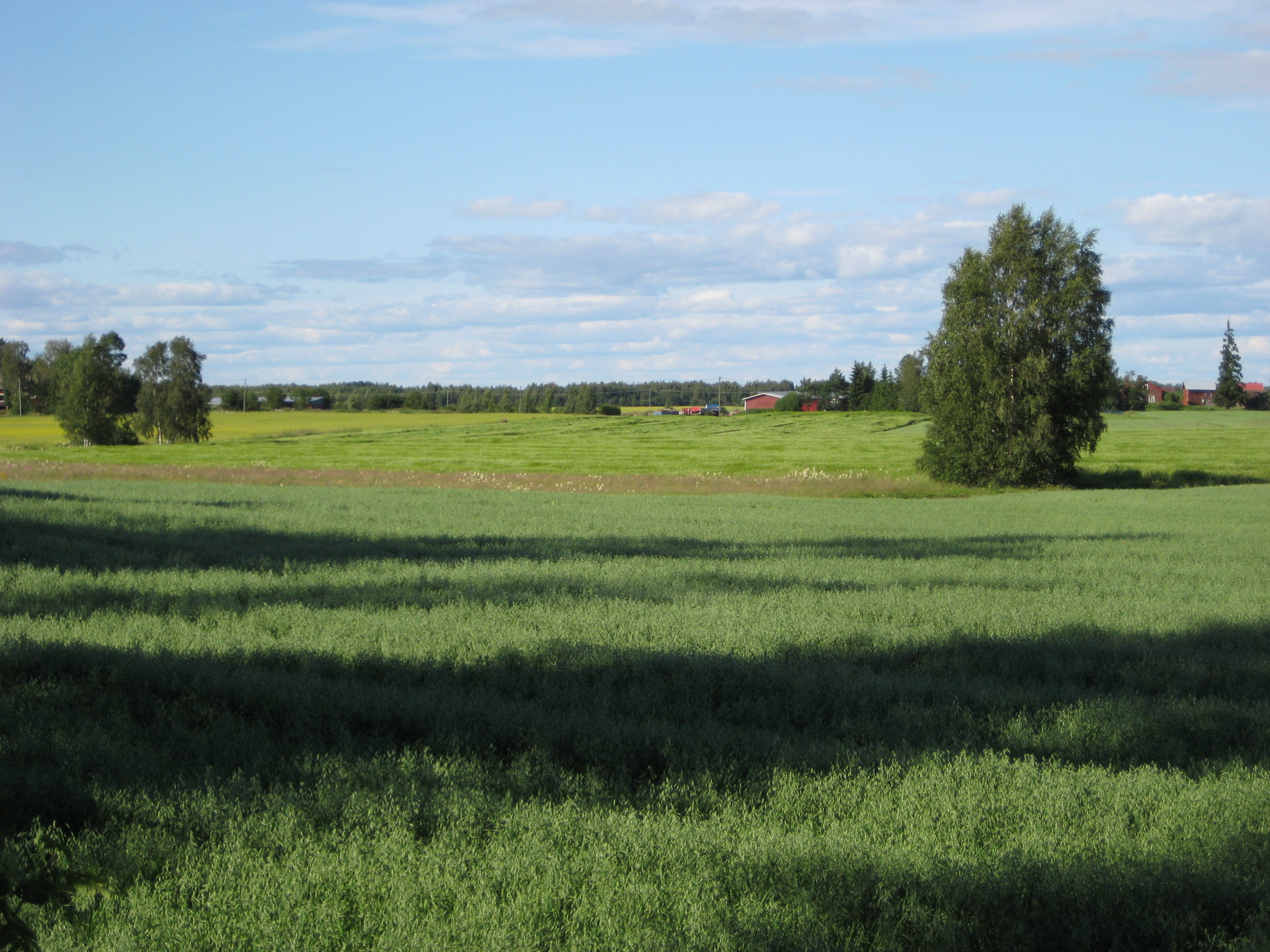
A field plain in Liminka, Finland

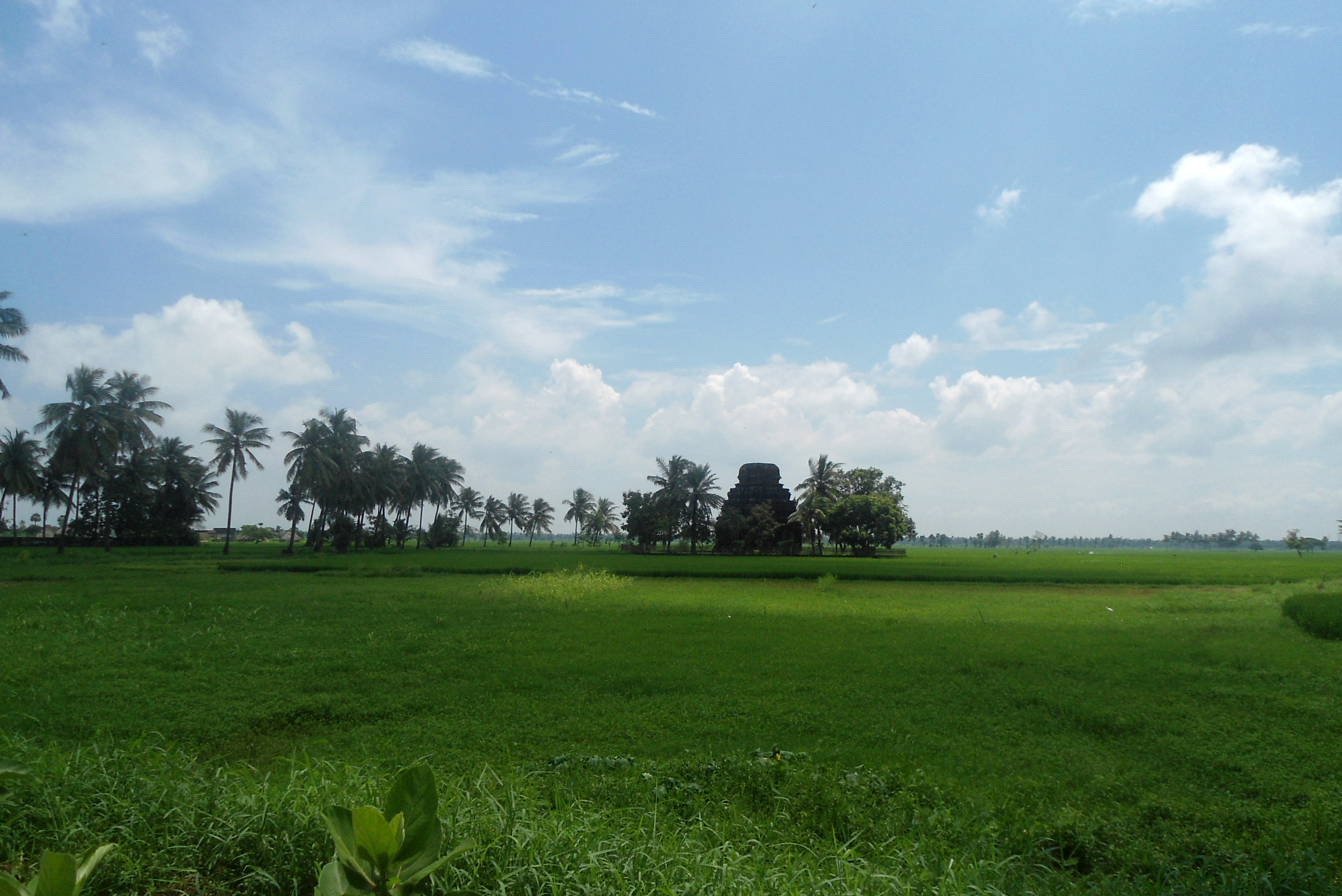
View of Fields at Biccavolu, Eastern coastal plains, Andhra Pradesh, India

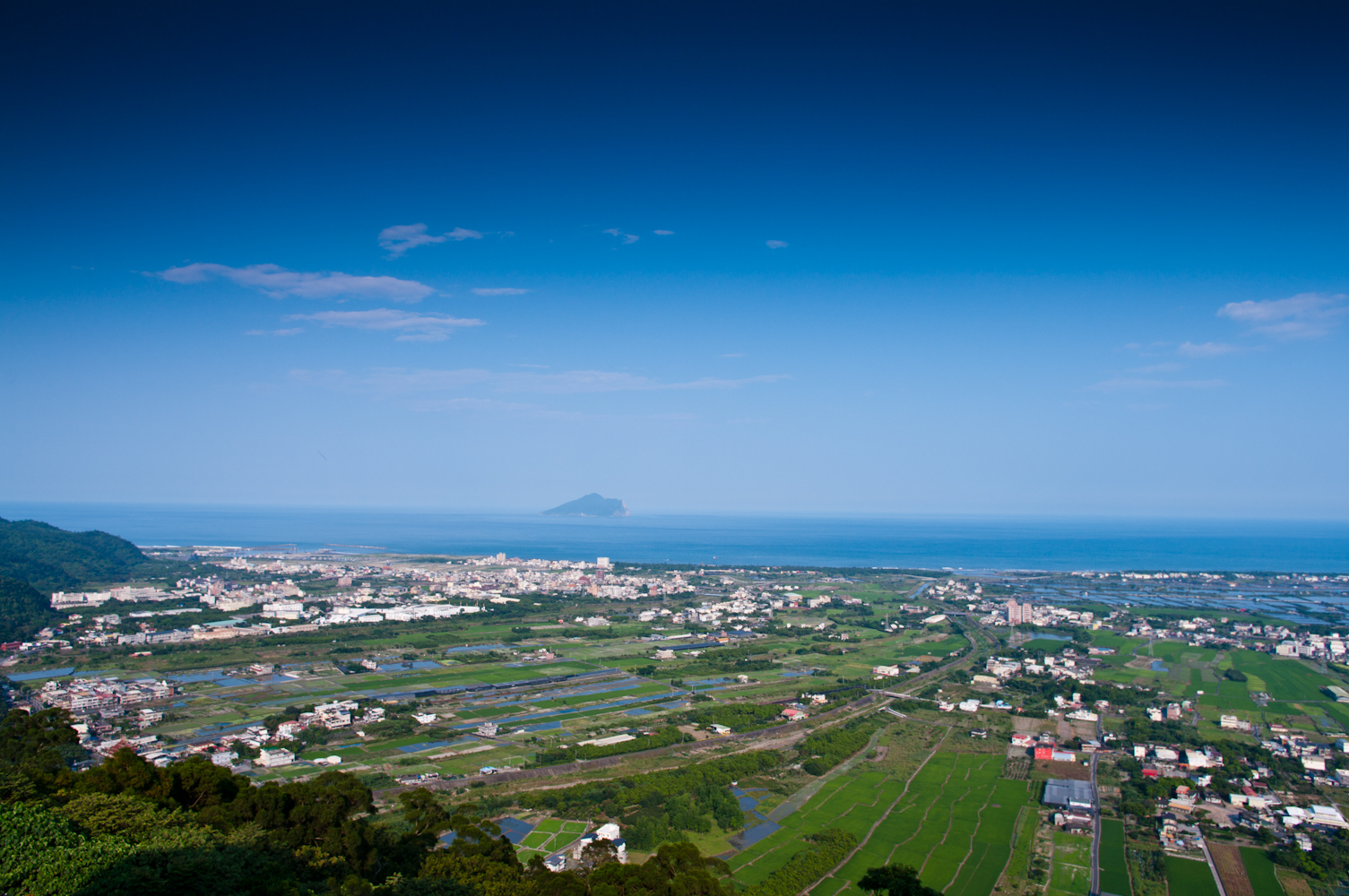
Yilan Plain, Taiwan

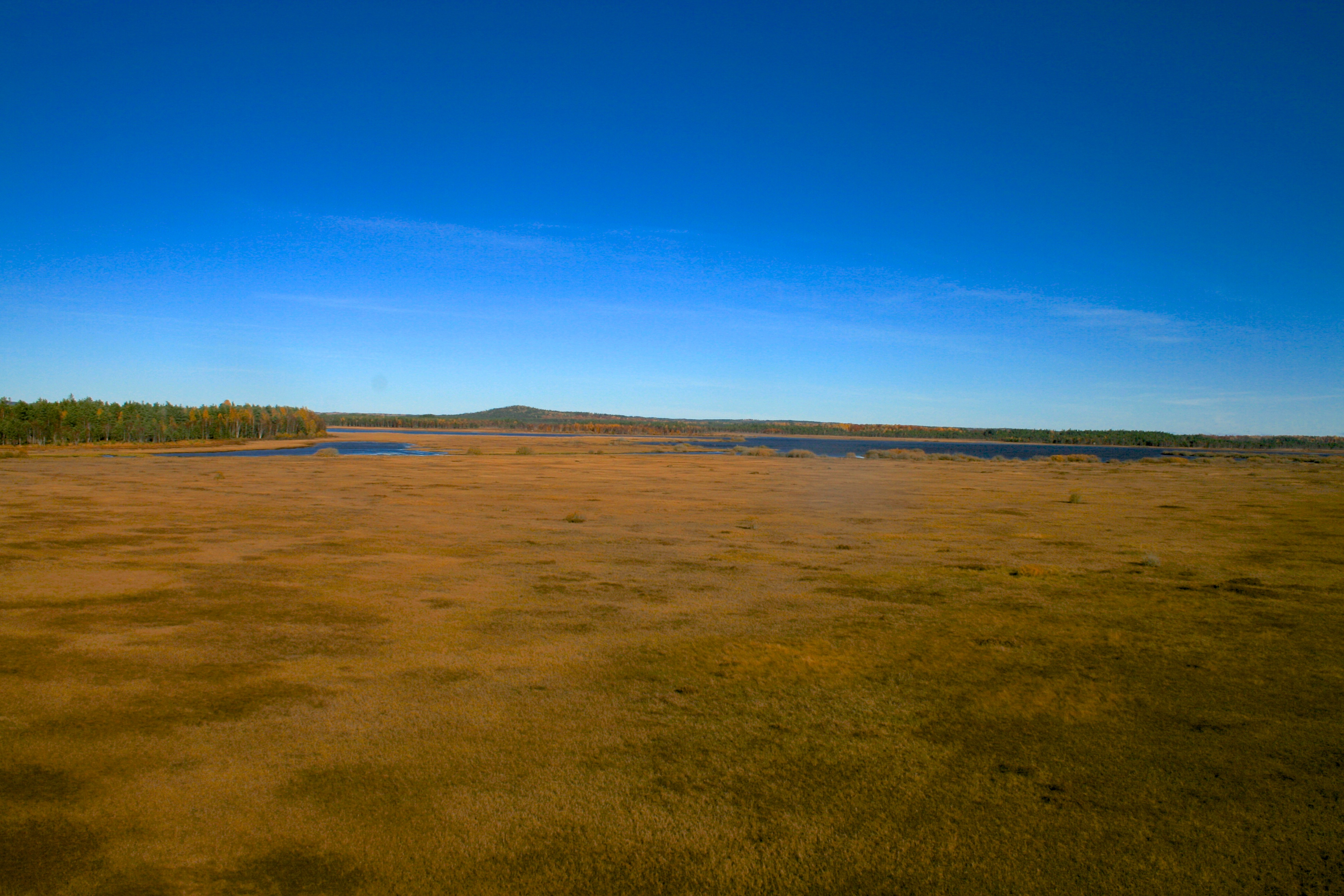
View of the South Småland peneplain at Store Mosse National Park in Sweden

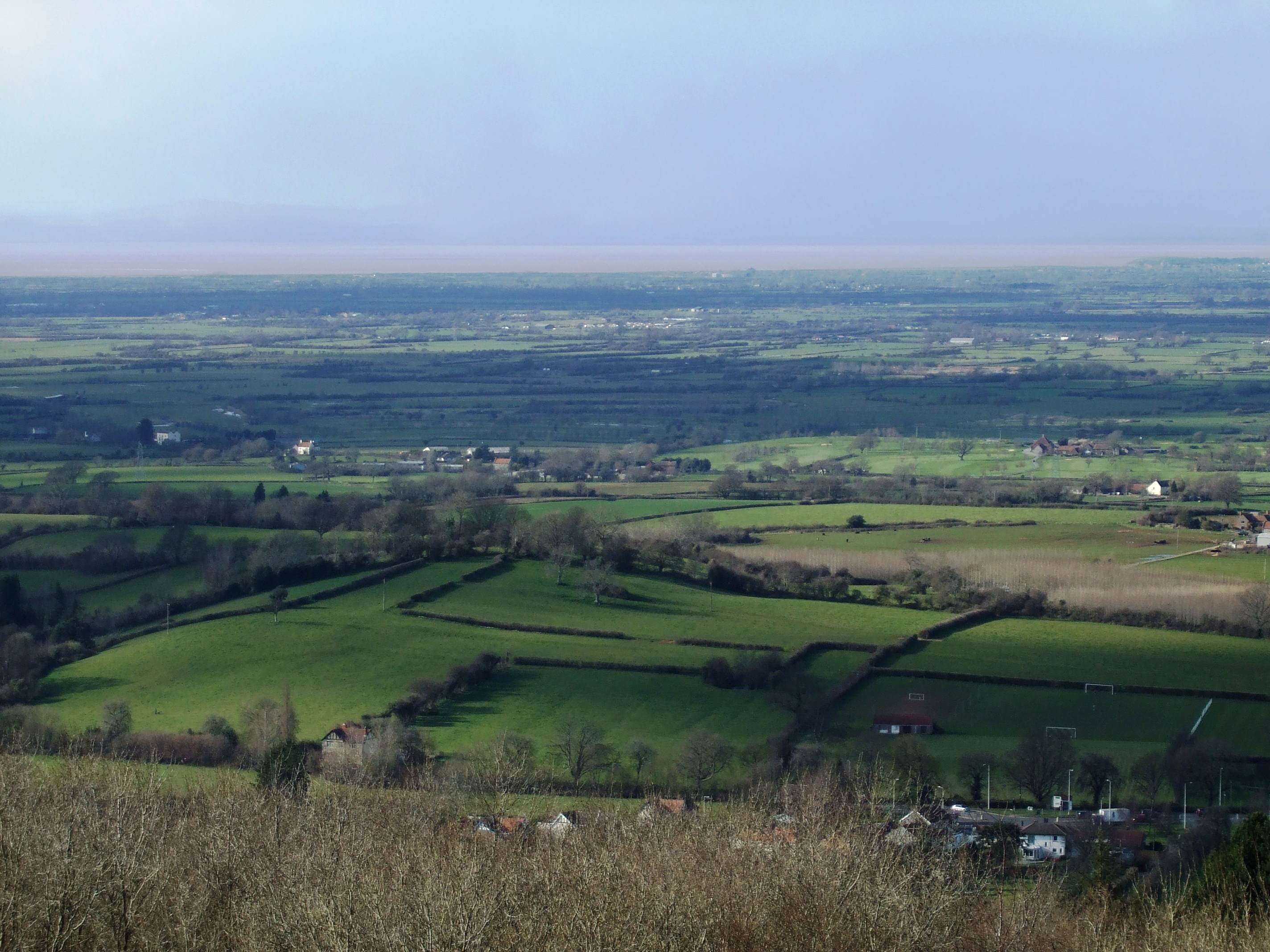
North Somerset Levels, as seen from Dolebury Warren, England, UK

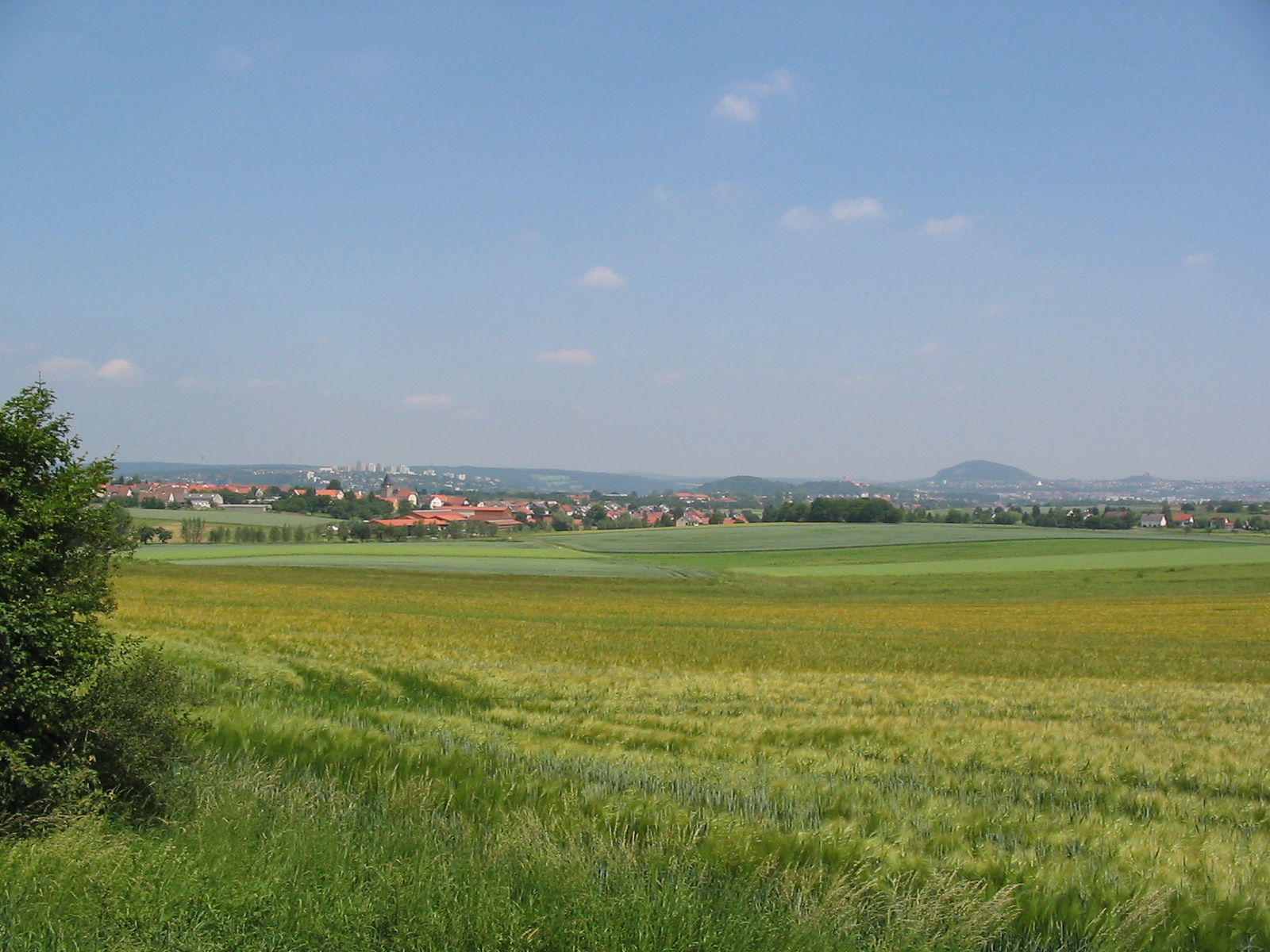
Terrain near the central German town of Fulda

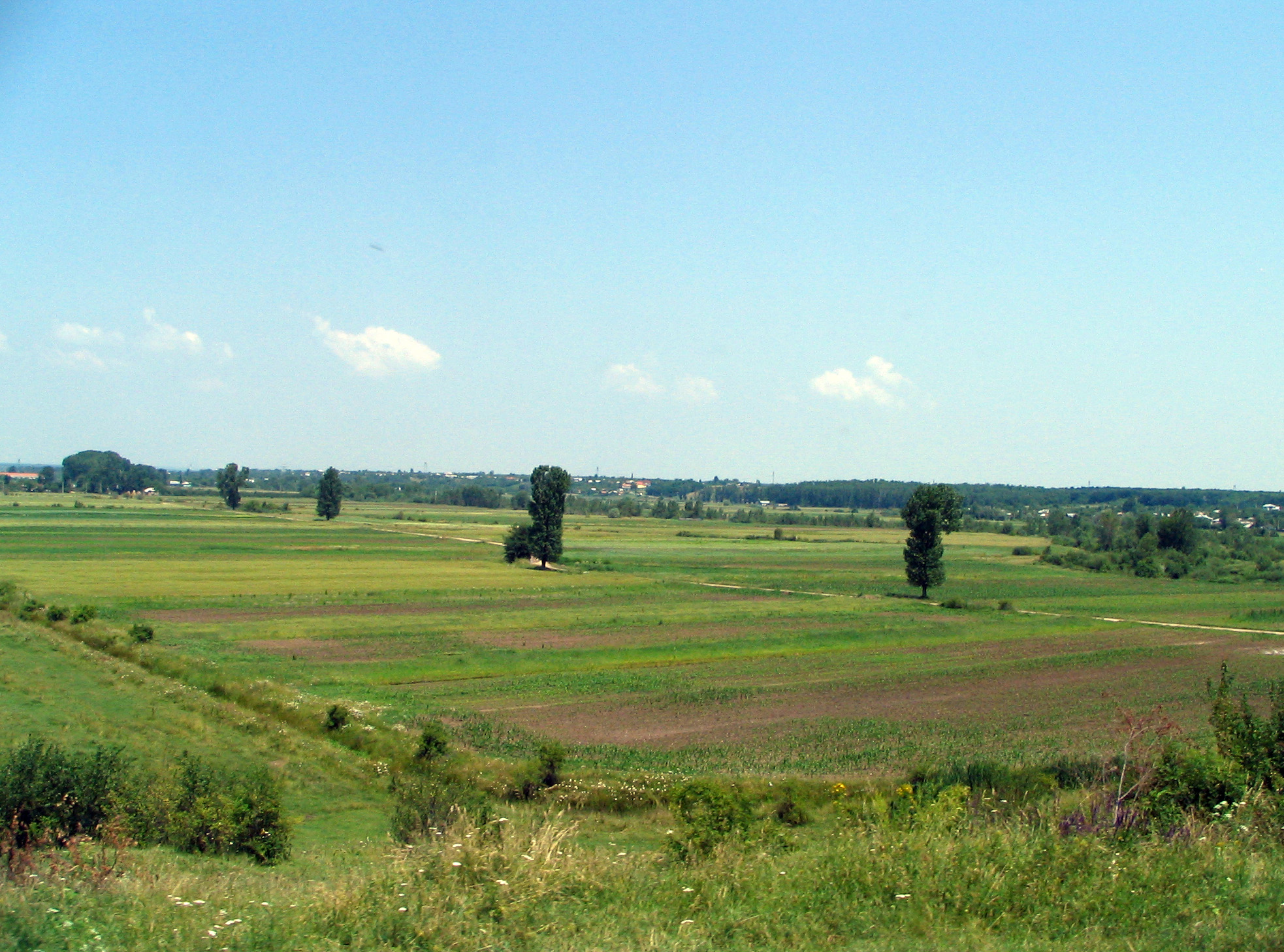
The Wallachian Plain, in the southern part of Argeș County

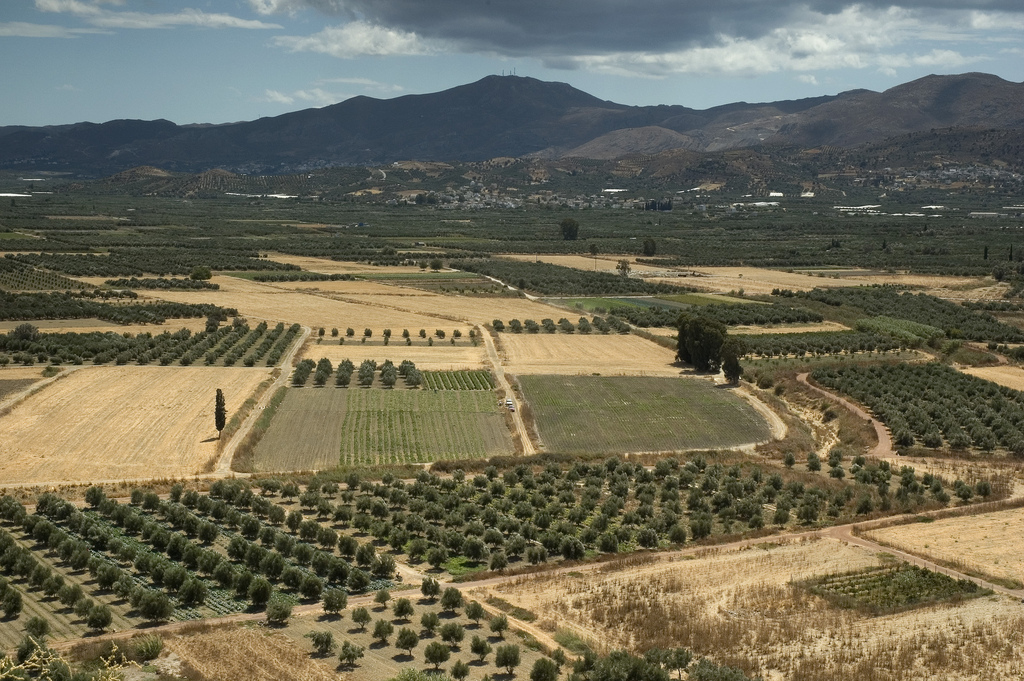
View of Messara from the hill of Phaestus, Greece

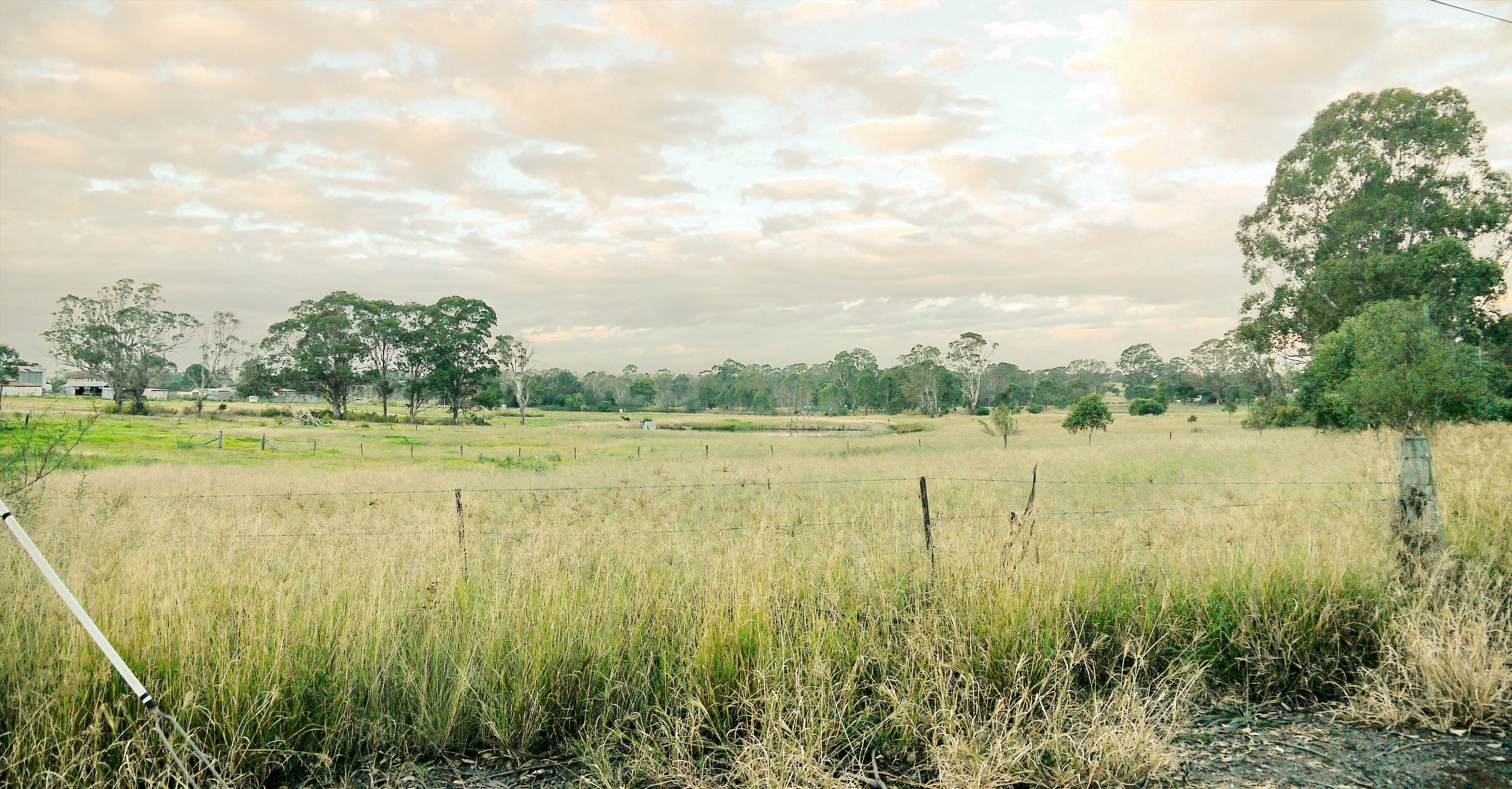
Cumberland Plain bushland in Western Sydney, Australia

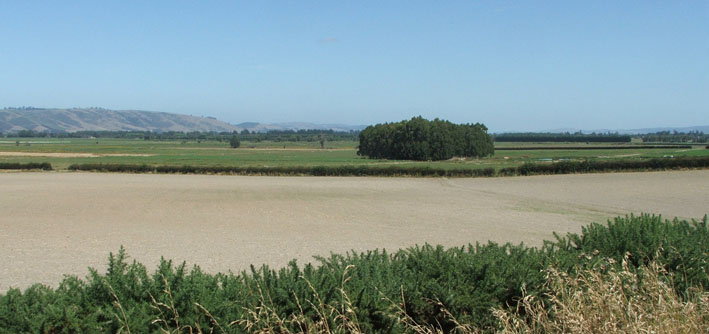
Looking southeast across the Taieri Plain, Otago, New Zealand

=== America ===
==== Caribbean and South America ====
- Altiplano (Bolivia, Peru, Chile)
- Altiplano Cundiboyacense (Colombia)
- Caroni Plain (Trinidad and Tobago)
- Chilean Central Valley
  - Cancha Rayada
  - Los Llanos
- Gran Chaco (Argentina, Bolivia, Paraguay)
- Llanos (Colombia and Venezuela)
- Pampas (Argentina, Uruguay, Brazil)
- Coastal plains of Chile

==== North America ====
- Atlantic coastal plain (United States)
- Carrizo Plain (California, United States)
- Great Plains (Canada and United States)
- Guatemala South Coast (Guatemala)
- Gulf Coastal Plain (Mexico and United States)
- Interior Plains (Canada and United States)
- Lake Superior Lowland (Wisconsin, United States)
- Laramie Plains (Wyoming)
- Mississippi Alluvial Plain (Mississippi)
- Oxnard Plain (Ventura County, California)
- Snake River Plain (Idaho)
- Hempstead Plains (Long Island, New York)

=== Asia ===
==== Eastern Asia ====
- Chianan Plain (Taiwan)
- Depsang Plains (China and India)
- Honam Plain (South Korea)
- Kantō Plain (Japan)
- Kedu Plain (Indonesia)
- Kewu Plain (Indonesia)
- Mallig Plains (Philippines)
- Nōbi Plain (Japan)
- North China Plain (China)
- Northeast China Plain (China)
- Osaka Plain (Japan)
- Pingtung Plain (Taiwan)
- Sarobetsu Pain (Japan)
- Sendai Plain (Japan)
- Yangtze Plain (China)
- Yilan Plain (Taiwan)

==== North Asia ====
- West Siberian Plain (Russia)

==== South Asia ====
- Bhuikhel (Nepal)
- Depsang Plains (India and China)
- Dooars (India and Bhutan)
- Eastern coastal plains (India)
- Indo-Gangetic Plains (Bangladesh, India, Nepal and Pakistan)
- More plains (India)
- North Bengal plains (Bangladesh and India)
- Punjab Plains (Pakistan and India)
- Terai (India and Nepal)
- Utkal Plains (India)
- Western coastal plains (India)

==== Western Asia ====
- Al-Ghab Plain (Syria)
- Aleppo plateau (Syria)
- Ararat Plain (Armenia and Turkey)
- Israeli coastal plain (Israel)
- Khuzestan Plain (Iran)
- Mugan plain (Azerbaijan and Iran)
- Nineveh Plains (Iraqi Kurdistan)
- Shiraki Plain (Georgia)

=== Europe ===
==== Central Europe ====
- Limagne (France)
- North German Plain
- Ochsenfeld (France)
- Pannonian Basin (Central Europe)
- Parndorf Plain (Austria)
- Westphalian Lowland (Germany)

==== Eastern Europe ====
- Bărăgan Plain (Romania)
- Danubian Plain (Bulgaria)
- Dnieper Lowland (Ukraine)
- East European Plain
- European Plain
- Great Hungarian Plain
- Kosovo field (Kosovo)
- Little Hungarian Plain (Austria, Hungary, and Slovakia)
- Pannonian Steppe (Hungary)
- Polesian Lowland (Ukraine and Belarus)
- Upper Thracian Plain (Bulgaria)
- Wallachian Plain (Romania)

==== Northern Europe ====
- Cheshire Plain (England)
- Hardangervidda (Norway)
- Kaffiøyra (Svalbard, Norway)
- Muddus plains (Sweden)
- North European Plain
- North Northumberland Coastal Plain (Northern England)
- North Somerset Levels (North Somerset, England)
- Salisbury Plain (England)
- Solway Plain (Cumbria, England)
- Somerset Levels (Somerset, England)
- South Coast Plain (Hampshire and Sussex, England)
- South Småland peneplain (Sweden)
- Stora Alvaret (Öland, Sweden)
- Strandflat (Norway)
- Sub-Cambrian peneplain (Nordic countries)
  - Central Swedish lowland
  - Ostrobothnian Plain (Finland)
- The Fylde (Lancashire, England)

==== Southern Europe ====
- Agro Nocerino Sarnese (Italy)
- Campidano (Italy)
- Lelantine Plain (Greece)
- Mesaoria (Cyprus)
- Messara Plain (Greece)
- Nurra (Sardinia, Italy)
- Po Valley (Italy)
- Rieti Valley (Central Italy)
- Tavoliere delle Puglie (Southern Italy)

=== Oceania ===
==== Australia ====
- Bogong High Plains (Victorian Alps, Australia)
- Cumberland Plain (Sydney, Australia)
- Esperance Plains (Western Australia)
- Molonglo Plain (Australian Capital Territory)
- Mulga Lands (eastern Australia)
- Nullarbor Plain (Southern Australia)
- Ord Victoria Plain (Northern Australia)
- Swan Coastal Plain (Perth, Australia)

==== New Zealand ====
- Awarua Plains (Southland)
- Canterbury Plains (Canterbury)
- Hauraki Plains (Waikato)
- Maniototo (Otago)
- Taieri (Otago)

== See also ==
- Field – Area of land used for agricultural purposes
- Flooded grasslands and savannas – Terrestrial biome
- Flood-meadow – Land adjacent to a river subject to seasonal flooding
- Machair – Fertile low-lying grassy plain
- Meadow – Open habitat vegetated primarily by non-woody plants
- Pasture – Land used for grazing
- Prairie – Ecosystems considered part of the temperate grasslands, savannas, and shrublands biome
- Rangeland – Biomes that can be grazed by animals
- Water-meadow – Artificially irrigated meadow
- Wet meadow – Type of wetland
