= Epeirogenic movement =

Upheavals or depressions of land exhibiting long wavelengths and little folding

In geology, epeirogenic movement (from Greek epeiros, land, and genesis, birth) is upheavals or depressions of land exhibiting long wavelengths and little folding apart from broad undulations. The broad central parts of continents are called cratons, and are subject to epeirogeny. The movement may be one of subsidence toward, or of uplift from, the center of Earth. The movement is caused by a set of forces acting along an Earth radius, such as those contributing to isostasy and faulting in the lithosphere.

Epeirogenic movement can be permanent or transient. Transient uplift can occur over a thermal anomaly due to convecting anomalously hot mantle, and disappears when convection wanes. Permanent uplift can occur when igneous material is injected into the crust, and circular or elliptical structural uplift (that is, without folding) over a large radius (tens to thousands of km) is one characteristic of a mantle plume.

In contrast to epeirogenic movement, orogenic movement is a more complicated deformation of the Earth's crust, associated with crustal thickening, notably associated with the convergence of tectonic plates. Such plate convergence forms orogenic belts that are characterized by "the folding and faulting of layers of rock, by the intrusion of magma, and by volcanism".

Epeirogenic movements may divert rivers and create drainage divides by upwarping of the crust along axes. Example of this is the deflection of Eridanos River in the Pliocene Epoch by the uplift of the South Swedish Dome or the present-day drainage divides between Limpopo and Zambezi rivers in southern Africa.

== Examples ==
Epeirogenic movement has caused the southern Rocky Mountain region to be uplifted from 1300 to 2000 m since the Eocene. This followed and is distinct from the creation of the Rocky Mountains during the Laramide Orogeny during the Late Cretaceous–early Cenozoic. The uplift is interpreted as due to lithospheric heating resulting from thinning and the intrusion of widespread middle Tertiary batholiths of relatively low density.

The South Swedish Dome has been uplifted and subsided multiple times by epeirogenic movements since the Cambrian leading to the uplift, tilting and partial erosion of the Sub-Cambrian peneplain. The doming has resulted in the formation of a piedmonttreppen relief in southern Sweden.
