= South Swedish highlands =

Hilly area covering large parts of Sweden

Coordinates: 56.9833°N 14.5500°E

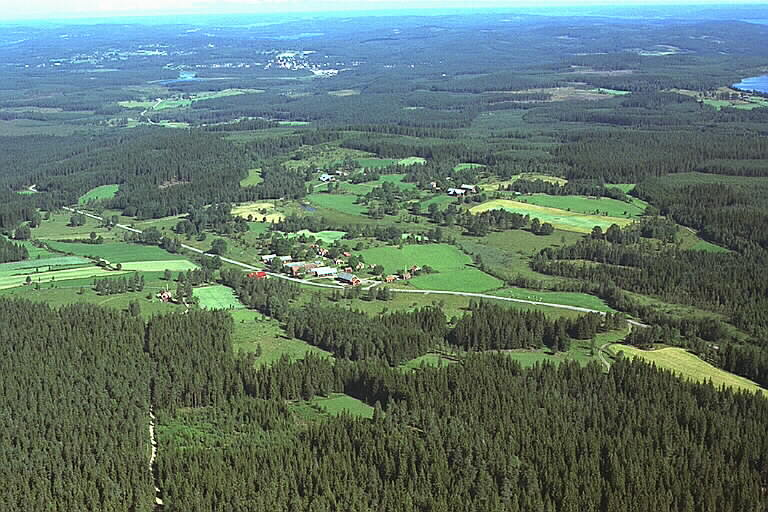
Aerial view of farms and forest in Ydre Municipality.

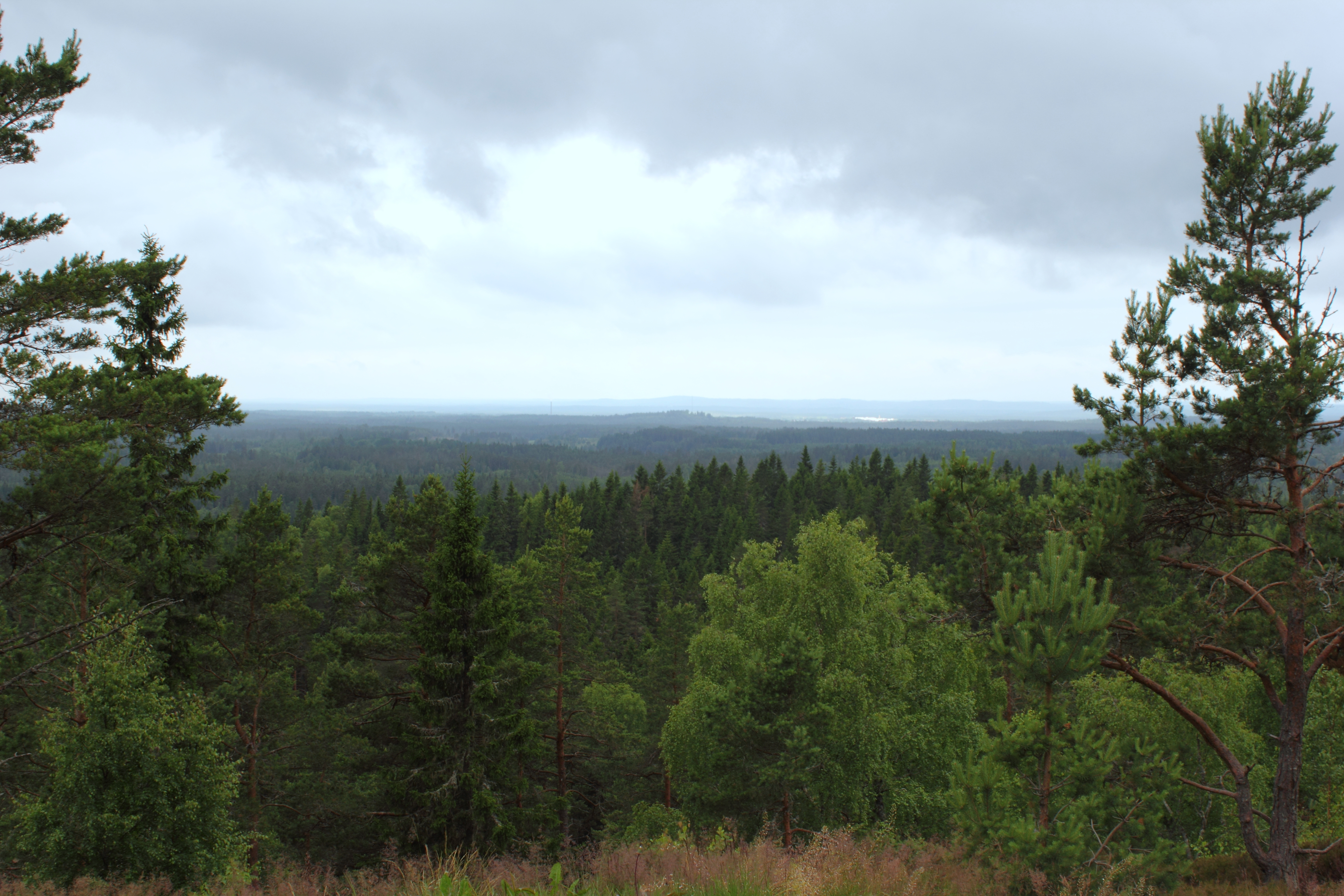
The forested landscape of the South Swedish highlands, seen from Skuruhatt in Eksjö Municipality.

The South Swedish highlands or South Swedish Uplands (Swedish: Sydsvenska höglandet) are a hilly area covering large parts of Götaland in southern Sweden. Except for a lack of deep valleys, the landscape is similar to the Norrland terrain found further north in Sweden. The central-eastern parts of the highlands contain about thirty narrow canyons locally known as skurus.

Much of the highlands lies above 200 m.a.s.l. and there are large areas around the highlands that exceed 100 m.a.s.l. The highlands are centered on Småland but cover also large swathes of Scania, Halland, Västergötland, Östergötland and Blekinge. The highest point lies 377 m.a.s.l.

== History ==
The South Swedish highlands have been populated since the Nordic Stone Age as evidenced by cist findings. During the Nordic Bronze Age (c. 1700–500 BC) there was a significant agricultural expansion across the highlands. Soils developed on glacial till were cleared, with stones then piled in cairns. Other periods of agricultural expansion are the Roman Iron Age and the High Middle Ages (c. 13th century).

Poor soil conditions have posed significant difficulties for agriculture in the highlands, meaning that over time small industries became relatively important in local economies. Many abandoned fields are now covered with forest. Vestiges of abandoned fields can be recognised through the highlands by the characteristic piles of stones made when areas were cleared for cultivation.

== Climate and weather events ==
The climate of the western parts of the highlands is more humid than on the east. This is due to orographic precipitation caused by southwestern wind forcing moist air over the highlands. Lake Sommen in the northeastern part of the highlands has relatively low humidity and low precipitation. Ljungby in the southwestern parts of the highlands holds the monthly precipitation record for Småland with 347 mm in August 1945. The South Swedish highlands has the records for the coldest and hottest temperatures in Götaland. The cold record is −38.5 °C on 16 January 1918 in Lommaryd, while the hot record is 38 °C on 29 June 1947 in Målilla.

Temperatures on Tomtabacken, are lower all year round than those of the surrounding area.

In January the mean daily temperature on the summit falls to around -5°C, which is similar to the temperature in Dalsland or Uppland, both of which are significantly further north. In July the mean daily temperature only reaches around 14°C, comparable with Jokkmokk on the Arctic Circle. The annual mean daily temperature is below 5°C, comparable to Östersund, 750 km further north. Although snowfall usually occurs from late October to early May, in the nearby village of Spinkabo measurable snowfall was observed on 30 September 1995 (12 cm) and 14 June 1982 (7 cm). Since only three months have a mean daily temperature exceeding 10°C, the climate qualifies as subarctic. Winter is often the longest season, in higher elevations lasting from mid-November until end of March. Galtåsen located far from the coast and on an altitude 360 m.a.s.l. averaging meteorological winter from 14 November until 2 April. Summer lasts from 2 June to 3 September.

Climate data for Tomtabacken 1931-1990
Month	Jan	Feb	Mar	Apr	May	Jun	Jul	Aug	Sep	Oct	Nov	Dec	Year
Mean daily maximum °C (°F)	−2.8 (27.0)	−2.8 (27.0)	1.3 (34.3)	7.5 (45.5)	13.2 (55.8)	17.3 (63.1)	18.5 (65.3)	17.0 (62.6)	13.1 (55.6)	7.6 (45.7)	1.8 (35.2)	−1.5 (29.3)	7.5 (45.5)
Daily mean °C (°F)	−5.0 (23.0)	−5.2 (22.6)	−2.4 (27.7)	2.4 (36.3)	8.2 (46.8)	12.5 (54.5)	14.0 (57.2)	12.7 (54.9)	9.1 (48.4)	4.9 (40.8)	0.0 (32.0)	−3.4 (25.9)	4.0 (39.2)
Mean daily minimum °C (°F)	−7.2 (19.0)	−7.6 (18.3)	−5.1 (22.8)	−2.7 (27.1)	3.2 (37.8)	7.7 (45.9)	9.5 (49.1)	8.6 (47.5)	5.2 (41.4)	2.1 (35.8)	−1.8 (28.8)	−5.3 (22.5)	0.5 (32.9)

Climate data for Galtåsen 361 m.a.s.l. (1931-1990) & extremes since 1901
Month	Jan	Feb	Mar	Apr	May	Jun	Jul	Aug	Sep	Oct	Nov	Dec	Year
Mean daily maximum °C (°F)	−3.0 (26.6)	−2.6 (27.3)	1.9 (35.4)	7.3 (45.1)	13.4 (56.1)	17.3 (63.1)	17.8 (64.0)	16.9 (62.4)	12.6 (54.7)	7.8 (46.0)	2.0 (35.6)	−1.6 (29.1)	7.5 (45.4)
Daily mean °C (°F)	−5.5 (22.1)	−5.5 (22.1)	−2.4 (27.7)	1.9 (35.4)	8.0 (46.4)	12.1 (53.8)	13.4 (56.1)	12.4 (54.3)	8.3 (46.9)	4.8 (40.6)	−0.2 (31.6)	−3.9 (25.0)	3.6 (38.5)
Mean daily minimum °C (°F)	−8.0 (17.6)	−8.4 (16.9)	−6.5 (20.3)	−3.1 (26.4)	2.8 (37.0)	6.9 (44.4)	8.6 (47.5)	8.0 (46.4)	4.4 (39.9)	1.8 (35.2)	−2.8 (27.0)	−6.0 (21.2)	−0.2 (31.6)
Average precipitation mm (inches)	75.3 (2.96)	50.8 (2.00)	60.5 (2.38)	62.6 (2.46)	71.3 (2.81)	80.7 (3.18)	109.8 (4.32)	115.6 (4.55)	103.2 (4.06)	78.1 (3.07)	84.0 (3.31)	73.4 (2.89)	964.4 (37.97)
Source 1: SMHI
Source 2: SMHI Monthly Data 2015-2019

Climate data for Taberg 342 m.a.s.l 2002–2018; extremes since 1901
Month	Jan	Feb	Mar	Apr	May	Jun	Jul	Aug	Sep	Oct	Nov	Dec	Year
Mean daily maximum °C (°F)	−0.7 (30.7)	−0.7 (30.7)	3.7 (38.7)	10.1 (50.2)	15.4 (59.7)	18.6 (65.5)	21.0 (69.8)	19.4 (66.9)	15.4 (59.7)	8.9 (48.0)	4.1 (39.4)	1.1 (34.0)	9.5 (49.1)
Daily mean °C (°F)	−3.6 (25.5)	−3.2 (26.2)	−0.5 (31.1)	4.5 (40.1)	9.4 (48.9)	12.8 (55.0)	15.5 (59.9)	14.3 (57.7)	10.8 (51.4)	5.5 (41.9)	1.7 (35.1)	−1.4 (29.5)	5.5 (41.9)
Mean daily minimum °C (°F)	−6.1 (21.0)	−6.1 (21.0)	−4.8 (23.4)	−1.1 (30.0)	3.2 (37.8)	7.0 (44.6)	9.9 (49.8)	9.2 (48.6)	6.1 (43.0)	2.1 (35.8)	−0.7 (30.7)	−3.8 (25.2)	1.5 (34.7)
Source 1: SMHI Average Data 2002–2018
Source 2: SMHI Open Data

The South Swedish highlands are less exposed to storms than the southern and western coasts of Sweden, yet storms can still be very destructive. The 2005 Cyclone Gudrun was particularly strong, causing much damage to forests in the southwestern part of the highlands. Spruces were particularly hit by Gudrun, while other trees with a more steady root system fared better. Damage was exacerbated by the planting of spruces and practice of clearcutting, which left many trees exposed to the wind. Gudrun also caused blackouts and disabled telecommunications infrastructure through the highlands.

== Geology ==
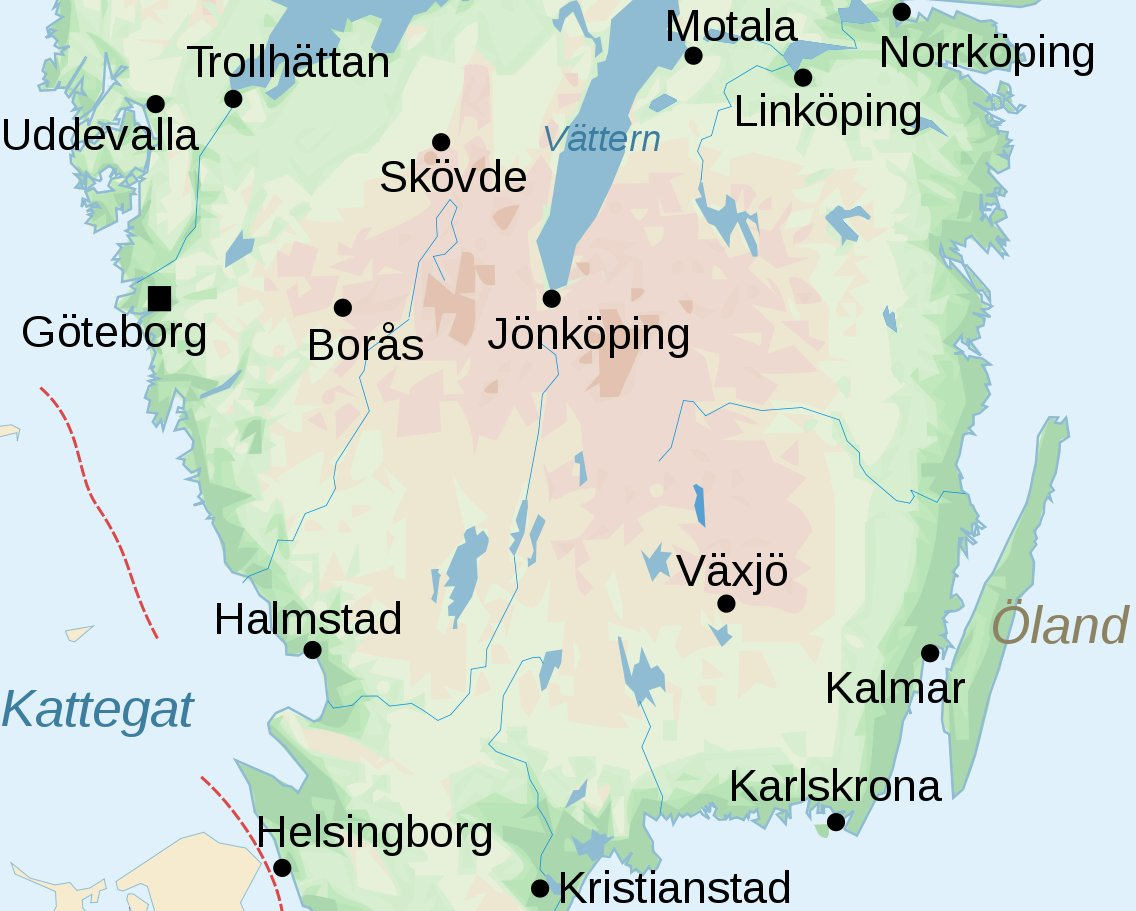
Map centered on the South Swedish highlands.

Within a geological context the highlands are the expression of the South Swedish Dome. The South Swedish Dome has subsided and been uplifted multiple times by epeirogenic movements during the Phanerozoic. The dome has had periods of subsidence, and burial in sediments have alternated with periods of exhumation and the formation of peneplains and hilly relief. The Sub-Cambrian peneplain of Late Neoproterozoic age is the oldest of the surfaces. It covers the eastern and northern flanks of the dome and its crest region where it is up-broken. The Sub-Mesozoic hilly relief covers the southern and western fringes of the dome, corresponding roughly with the counties of Halland, Blekinge and northeastern Scania. The youngest well-defined surface is the South Småland peneplain that formed in the Neogene. In detail the South Swedish Dome has the form of a piedmonttreppen or staircase of erosion surfaces. From top to bottom the levels are:

- the crestal and upbroken portions of the Sub-Cambrian peneplain
- the 300 m a.s.l. peneplain (Note: This level was considered as part of a post-Silurian peneplain by Sten Rudberg as it could be matched to hills in Västergötland (Kinnekulle, Halleberg, Hunneberg and Billingen). Karna Lidmar-Bergström consider this correlation plausible but the evidence tenuous.)
- the 200 m a.s.l. peneplain, containing various inselbergs. (Note: The existence of this surface was first noted by S. Nordlindh in 1924 in a monograph about hydropower and topography.)
- the South Småland peneplain (175–125 m a.s.l.) (Note: The South Småland peneplain was first noted by Sten De Geer in 1913.)

- the 100 m a.s.l. surface which is part of the South Småland peneplain

The Late Cenozoic uplift of the dome is tentatively related to far-field compressional stresses that has uplifted the region as a giant anticline-like lithosphere fold. As such it is similar to uplifted passive margins like the Scandinavian Mountains or the mountains of Western and Eastern Greenland.

=== Last ice age and deglaciation ===
During the last deglaciation of the Weichselian Ice Sheet the South Swedish highlands was a place of ice flow divergence. Deglaciation of southern Sweden was relatively slow with ice margin retreat rates of less than 150 m/yr. The retreat was interrupted multiple times by small glacier advances. These advances led to the formation of a series of end moraine systems. During deglaciation in southern Sweden glacier ice was mostly warm-based with some lesser parts being cold-based.

At present various lakes in the South Swedish highlands contain planktonic crustacean species that are relics from the time the Weichselian Ice Sheet left the area about 12,000 years ago. Lake Sommen stands out for having as much as three glacial relict crustacean species. These species are Pallasea quadrispinosa, Mysis affinis and Limnocalanus macrurus. Yet the lake lacks the most common relict crustacean found in the lakes of southern Sweden, the Mysis relicta.

== See also ==
- Baltic Klint
- Central Swedish lowland
- High Coast
