= Bergsten =

Bergsten is a Swedish surname.

== Geographical distribution ==
As of 2014, 74.8% of all known bearers of the surname Bergsten were residents of Sweden (frequency 1:4,155), 17.2% of the United States (1:661,632), 2.7% of Norway (1:61,218), 1.3% of Brazil (1:4,869,338) and 1.3% of Denmark (1:137,672).

In Sweden, the frequency of the surname was higher than national average (1:4,155) in the following counties:

1. Dalarna County (1:1,749)
2. Örebro County (1:1,889)
3. Västerbotten County (1:1,988)
4. Västernorrland County (1:2,238)
5. Värmland County (1:3,083)
6. Gotland County (1:3,440)
7. Kalmar County (1:3,528)
8. Östergötland County (1:3,558)
9. Västmanland County (1:3,653)
10. Västra Götaland County (1:3,900)
11. Uppsala County (1:3,975)
12. Jönköping County (1:3,999)

== People ==
- Carl Bergsten (1879–1935), Swedish architect
- Curt Bergsten (1912–1987), Swedish football forward
- Karl-Erik Bergsten (1909–1990), Swedish geographer
- C. Fred Bergsten (born 1941), American economist, author and political adviser
- Clara Petersson Bergsten (born 2002), Swedish handballer
