= Bolmån =

Coordinates: 56°39′N 13°46′E

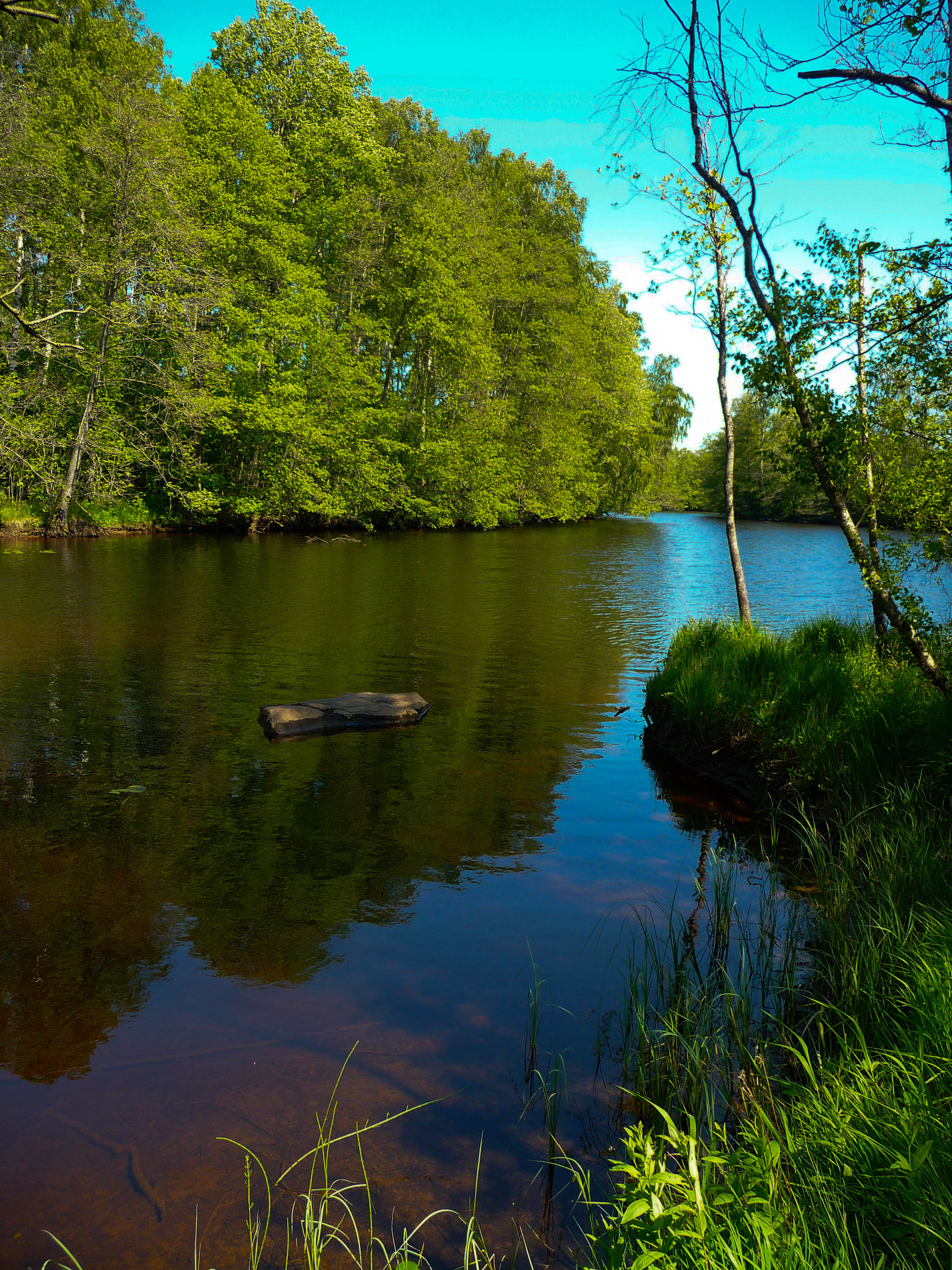

Location
- Country: Sweden

Physical characteristics
- Source: Bolmen
- Mouth: Lagan
- Length: 150 km (93 mi)
- Discharge
  - average: 21 m^{3}/s (740 cu ft/s)

Bolmån is a river in Sweden. The river drains the southwest portion of the South Småland peneplain.
