= South Småland peneplain =

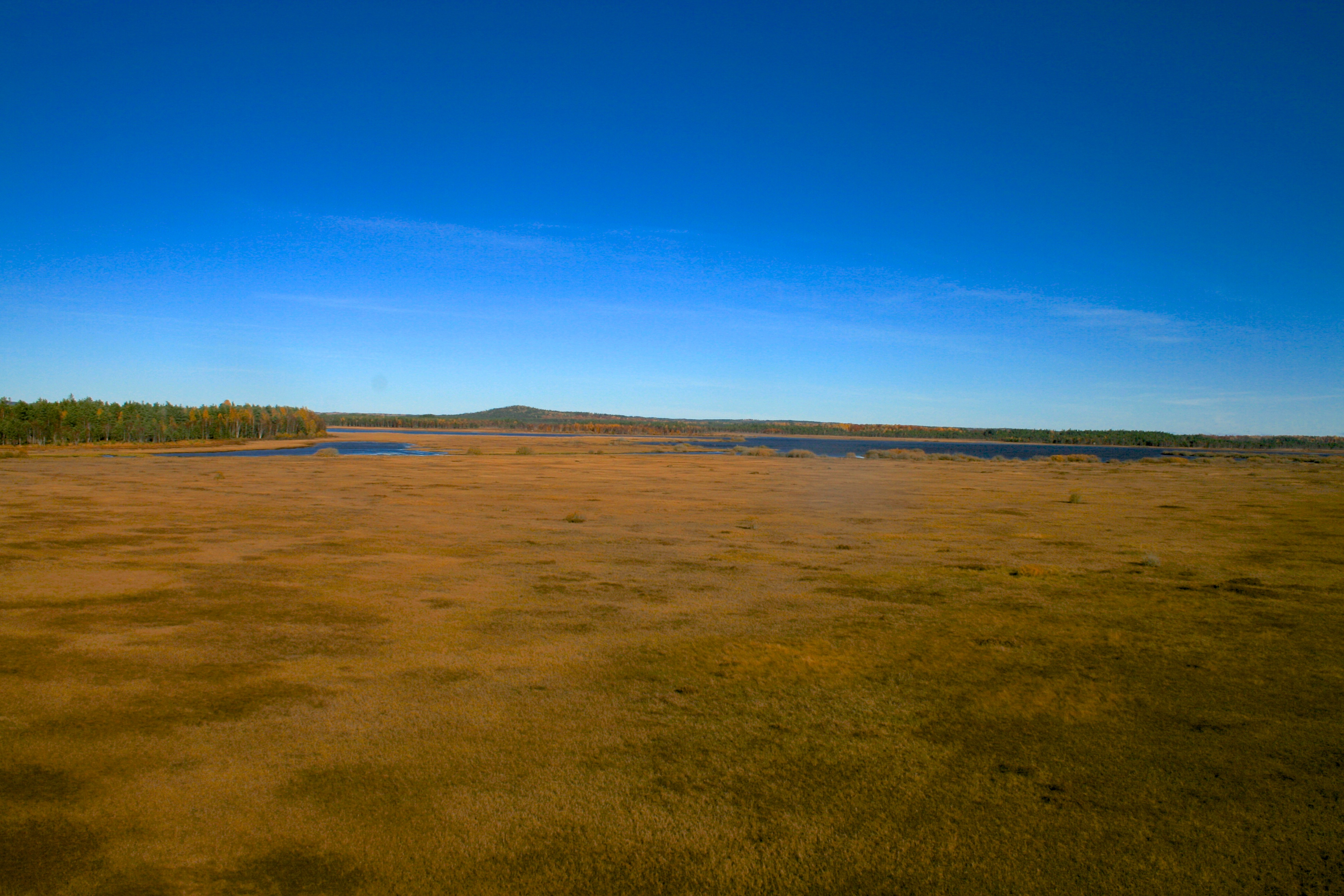
View of the South Småland peneplain at Store Mosse National Park. Note the residual hill or inselberg in the background.

The South Småland peneplain (Swedish: Sydsmåländska peneplanet) is a large flattish erosion surface, a peneplain, formed during the Tertiary, covering large swathes of southern Småland and nearby areas in Southern Sweden. To the east the South Småland peneplain bounds with the Sub-Cambrian peneplain uphill across an escarpment. While almost as flat as the Sub-Cambrian peneplain the South Småland peneplain differs in that it contains far more residual hills and that it has never been covered by sedimentary rocks. To the south and west (chiefly Halland and Blekinge) the peneplain transitions into Mesozoic-aged hilly surfaces.

In a 2013 study the surface is described as extending over an altitude range of 100 to 150 meters above sea level, while in a subsequent 2017 study the main surface is said to range from 175 to 125 m a.s.l. with a lower level at 100 m a.s.l. existing near the Blekinge-Småland border. The South Småland peneplain is the lowest surface in a piedmonttreppen or staircase of erosion surfaces that make up the South Swedish Dome. The level immediately above it is the 200 m peneplain, that is then followed by the 300 m peneplain and the crestal portion of the Sub-Cambrian peneplain.

The western part of the peneplain is drained by the river Nissan while Bolmån drains the southwest. Mörrumsån drains eastern parts of peneplain. It is possible that the Kvärkabäcken and Skäralid streams that traverse the Söderåsen horst in Scania are old antecedent rivers that once flowed through the South Småland peneplain. The existence of this plain was first noted by Sten De Geer in 1913 who termed it Smålands urbergslätt.

== See also ==
- Norrland terrain
