= Sub-Cambrian peneplain =

Ancient, extremely flat, erosion surface

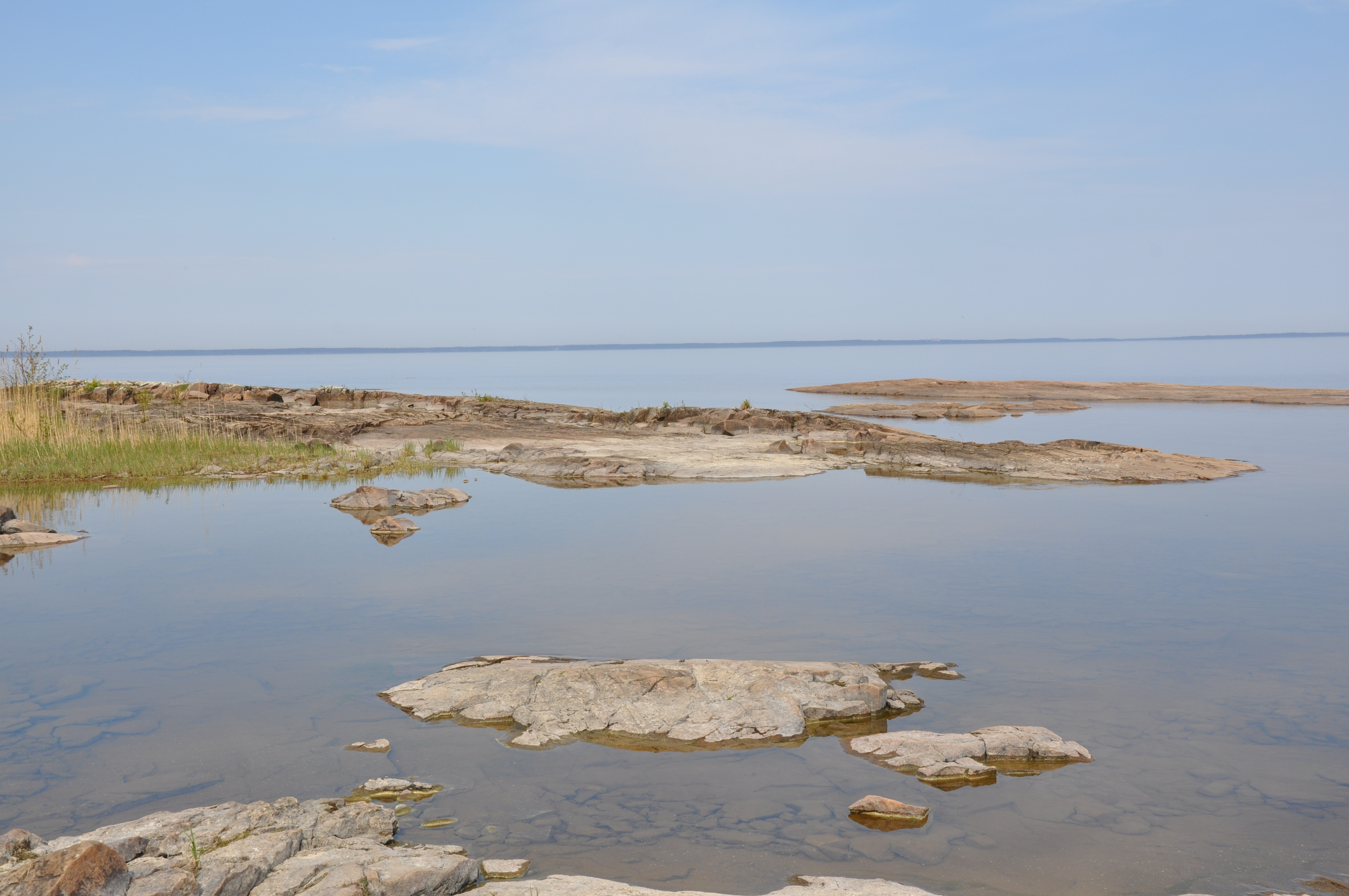
Extraordinary flat surfaces of the Sub-Cambrian peneplain around the shores of Lake Vänern near Kinnekulle

The sub-Cambrian peneplain is an ancient, extremely flat, erosion surface (peneplain) that has been exhumed and exposed by erosion from under Cambrian strata over large swathes of Fennoscandia. Eastward, where this peneplain dips below Cambrian and other Lower Paleozoic cover rocks. The exposed parts of this peneplain are extraordinarily flat with relief of less than 20 m. The overlying cover rocks demonstrate that the peneplain was flooded by shallow seas during the Early Paleozoic. Being the oldest identifiable peneplain in its area the Sub-Cambrian peneplain qualifies as a primary peneplain.

The surface was first identified by Arvid Högbom in a 1910 publication, with Sten Rudberg publishing the first extensive map in 1954. This mapping has been improved upon by Karna Lidmar-Bergström since the 1980s.

== Extent ==
The Sub-Cambrian peneplain extends as an almost continuous belt along the eastern coast of Sweden for some 700 km (430 miles) from north to south. Near Stockholm and Hudiksvall the peneplain is densely dissected by joint valleys and at the High Coast the Sub-Cambrian peneplain is both highly uplifted and eroded. More inland the peneplain can be traced at the crestal region of the South Swedish Dome where it is dissected by joint valleys. The Sub-Cambrian peneplain in the crestal region of the South Swedish Dome is the highest step in a piedmonttreppen system seen in Småland. In southern Sweden the peneplain surfaces tilt away from the crest of South Swedish Dome, to the northwest in Västergötland, to the northeast in Östergötland and to the east in eastern Småland. At this last region the sub-Cambrian peneplain is truncated to the west by a well defined and prominent scarp that separates it from the South Småland peneplain to the west. (Note: The scarp can be observed east of Växjö.)

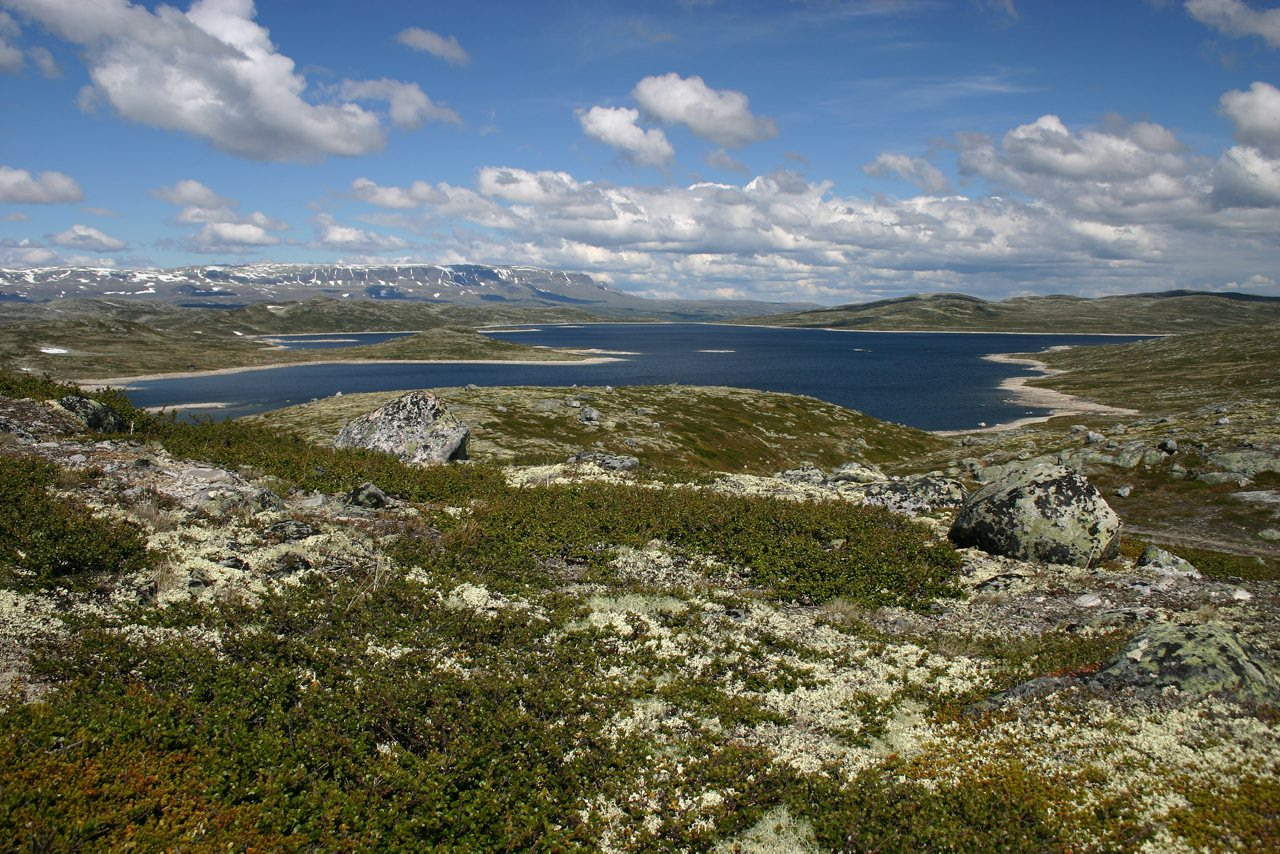
Much of the Hardangervidda plateau in the Norway is believed to be an uplifted part of the peneplain

In the Central Swedish lowland the peneplain extends further west being 450 km (280 miles) wide from west to east. Immediately east and south of lake Vänern the peneplain tilts west and north respectively. This is reflected in that the southeastern part of the lake is very shallow but gets progressively deeper towards the northwest. In Bohuslän, at the northern end of the Swedish West Coast, there is some uncertainty over whether the hilltops are remnants of the peneplain. A similar situation occurs in central Halland. Further west, parts of the Paleic surface in Norway have been interpreted to be part of the peneplain that has been tectonically uplifted and is apparently disrupted by NNE–SSW trending faults. Near the 1,100-metre (3,600 ft) high Hardangervidda plateau in Norway is the Sub-Cambrian peneplain which has been uplifted at least 1,000 metres (3,300 ft), albeit Hardangervidda itself is part of a much younger peneplain formed in the Miocene epoch.

At Stöttingfjället in northern Sweden the peneplain occur, as result of tectonic uplift, at about 650 metres (2,130 ft) giving origin to a series of water gaps including those of Ångermanälven, Indalsälven and Ljusnan.

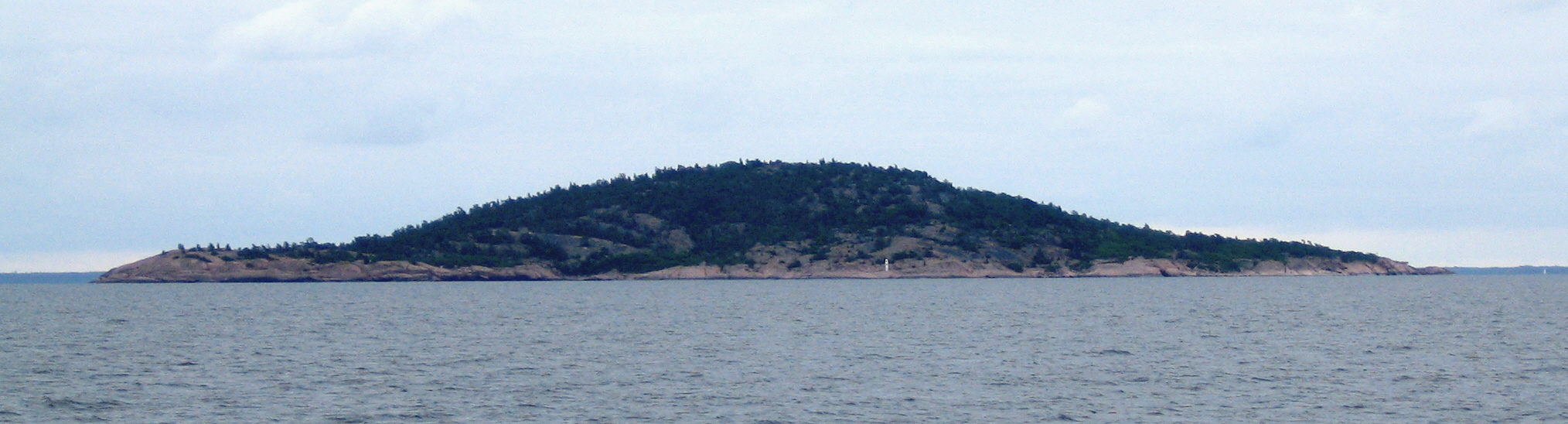
Blå Jungfrun, an inselberg and island formed in connection to the peneplain.

In northwestern Finland the Ostrobothnian Plain is a continuation of the peneplain. To the east the Sub-Cambrian peneplain continues as an unconformity beneath the East European Platform. (Note: This is known from borehole explorations and seismic profiles.) On a grand-scale the peneplain is not completely flat as it has been deformed. This deformation is an isostatic response to erosion and the load of Phanerozoic sediments that rests above much of the peneplain. The peneplain is characterized by a general lack of inselbergs. One exception to this is the island Blå Jungfrun in the Baltic Sea which is an ancient inselberg formed in Precambrian time and buried in sandstone after its formation. Blå Jungfrun remained buried until erosion of the East European Platform freed it in geologically recent times. Further southeast a series of buried inselbergs on top the peneplain have been identified through seismic reflection in Lithuania.

== Origin ==
Interpretations of Jotnian sandstone imply that much of the Baltic Shield have had faint relief since the Mesoproterozoic, but no exhumed peneplain from this period has been preserved. (Note: There have been suggestions of the existence of an exhumed Sub-Jotnian peneplain. This has, however, not been proved.) The low relief terrain on which the Jotnian sandstone deposited was disturbed by the Sveconorwegian orogeny in western Sweden about 1,000 million years ago and then begun to erode again into a terrain of subdued relief.

The peneplain formed after 600 million years ago but prior to the Cambrian transgression. The basement rocks forming the peneplain surface were exhumed from depths where the temperature was in excess of 100 °C (212 °F) prior to the formation of peneplain. Karna Lidmar-Bergström and co-workers assume the peneplain formed through a cycle of erosion with a preceding brief valley phase and that it grades down to a former sea level. Due to the absence of land vegetation in Precambrian times sheet wash is thought to have been an important process of erosion leading to the formation of extensive pediments. Sheet wash would also have hindered the formation of deep weathering profiles. Indeed, at the places the substrate of the Sub-Cambrian peneplain is kaolinized it never exceeds a few meters in depth. In Norway's Finnmark the peneplain is roughly contemporaneous with the formation of kaolinite, smectite and illite up to 15 metres (49 feet) below the surface's contact with marine sedimentary rock of Cambrian age.

== Sedimentary rock cover ==
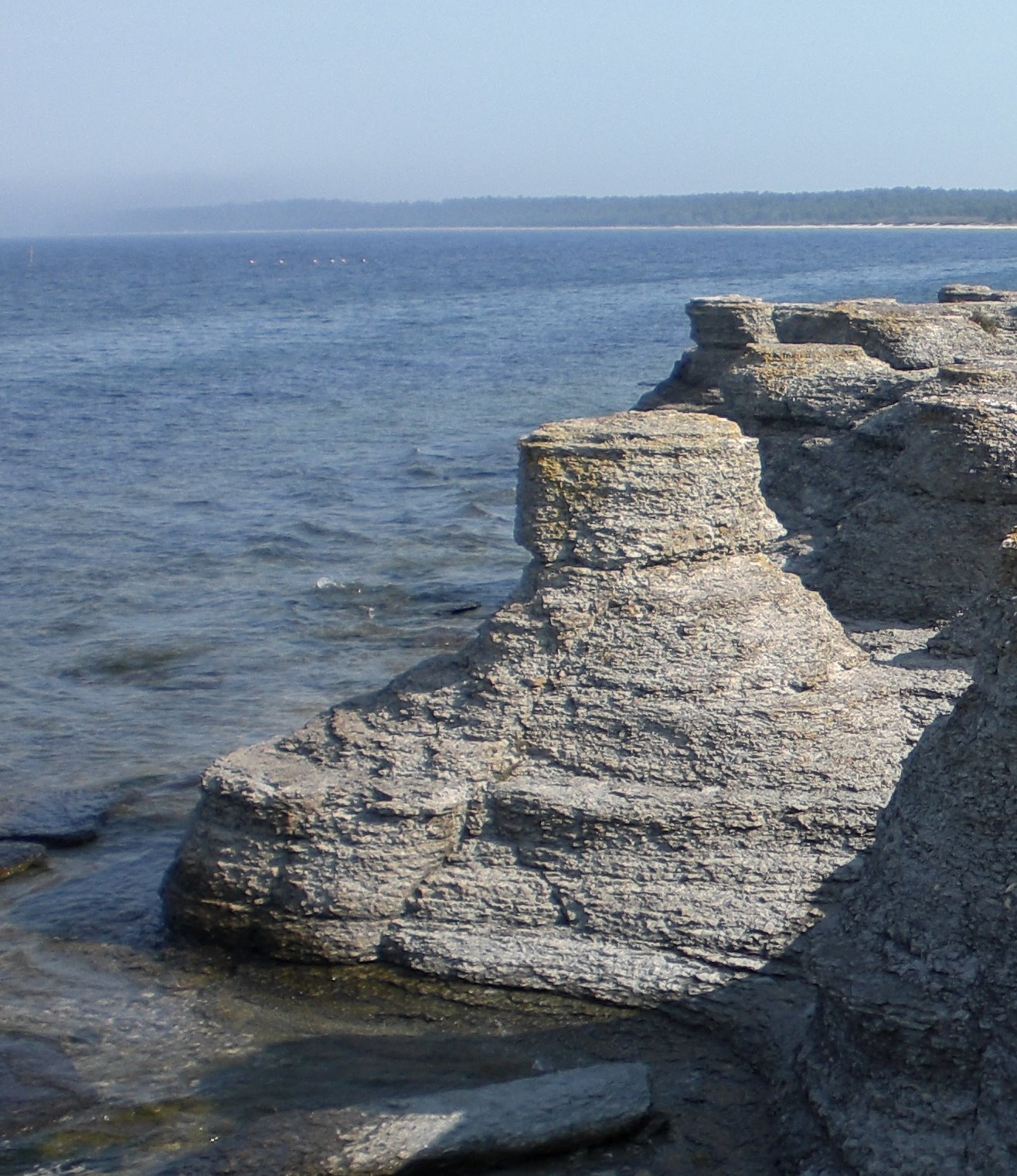
Limestone stacks of Byrum's raukar in Öland laterally close to the exhumed parts of the peneplain and also close to the buried parts of the peneplain.

The flatness of the peneplain meant that during the Cambrian transgression very large areas were swiftly flooded forming large and shallow inland seas in changing configurations. The new relief formed on top of Cambrian sediments smoothed out irregularities in the peneplain. Early Cambrian sandstones overlying the peneplain in southern Norway, Scania and Bornholm have likely never been recycled. This means the parent rocks of the sandstone were eroded and the sediment strongly reworked and weathered reaching sedimentary maturity with no other in-between step or hiatus. The source areas for these sandstones are local rocks from the Transscandinavian Igneous Belt or the Sveconorwegian and Gothian orogens.

== See also ==
- Baltic Klint
- Muddus plains
- Norrland terrain
