= Sten De Geer =

- Born: 26 April 1886; Stockholm
- Died: 2 June 1933 (aged 47); Gothenburg
- Citizenship: Sweden
- Education: Uppsala University
- Known for: Baltoscandia; Joint valley landscape Norrland terrain South Småland peneplain
- Father: Gerard De Geer
- Scientific career
- Fields: Geography, Ethnography
- Workplaces: Stockholms högskola Stockholm School of Economics; Uppsala University; Göteborgs högskola

Sten De Geer was a Swedish professor of geography and ethnography. As son of geologist Gerard De Geer Sten was born into the Swedish nobility holding the title of baron.
