= Piedmonttreppen =

A piedmonttreppen or piedmont benchland is a conceived landform consisting in a succession of benches at different heights and that forms in sequence during the uplift of a geological dome. The concept was first proposed in a posthumous publication by Walther Penck in 1924.

Penck's type area for the piedmontreppen was the Black Forest of Germany. Outside Germany the South Swedish Dome has been identified as containing a piedmonttreppen, with the uppermost and oldest surface being the Sub-Cambrian peneplain. It is followed by three surfaces, one at 300 m a.s.l., another at 200 m and then the South Småland peneplain. There have been attempts at describing the southern portion of the Scandinavian Mountains as having a piedmonttreppen topography made up of paleic surfaces in the uplands and a strandflat at sea level. This idea has been strongly contested by Olaf Holtedahl. Later authors also stress that the Scandinavian Mountains cannot be described as a series of domes.
