= Geomorphology (journal) =

Scientific journal

- Discipline: Geomorphology
- Language: English
- Edited by: Achim A. Beylich, Zhongyuan Chen, Scott A. Lecce, Takashi Oguchi, Markus Stoffel, Martin Stokes, and Yongqiang Zong

Publication details
- Impact factor: 3.819 (2019)

Standard abbreviations
- ISO 4: Geomorphology

Indexing
- ISSN: 0169-555X

Links
- Journal homepage; Online access

Geomorphology is a peer-reviewed scientific journal about geomorphology.
