= Norrland terrain =

Geomorphic unit covering northern Sweden

The purple line marks a version of the southern boundary of the Norrland Terrain.

Norrland terrain (Swedish: Norrlandsterräng) is a geomorphic unit covering the bulk of Norrland and the northwestern half of Svealand. Except for The High Coast the coastal areas of Norrland do not belong to the Norrland terrain. The southern and eastern boundary of the Norrland terrain is made up of geological faults that disrupt the Sub-Cambrian peneplain found the lowlands. In some locations these faults have been extensively eroded making the Norrland terrain boundary partly a result of erosion. Karna Lidmar-Bergström categorizes the Norrland Terrain into the following classes:

1. Highlands with well developed valleys above 500 m.a.s.l. (Note: Geographer Anders Rapp do however exclude the Scandinavian Mountains from the terrain.)
2. Plains with residual hills of Northern Sweden (Note: "Plains with residual hills", "Monadnock plain" or "Inselberg plain" are translations of the original Swedish term "Bergkullsslätt". Another name for these surfaces in northern Sweden is Muddus plains.)
3. Undulating hilly land of Övertorneå/Överkalix (Note: "Undulating hilly land" is a translation of the original Swedish name "Bergkullsterräng" or "Bergkullsland".)
4. Undulating hilly land of Boden area
5. Large scale joint valley landscapes (Note: "Large scale joint valley landscape" is a translation of the original Swedish term "Storskalig sprickdalslandskap". Sprickdalslandskap is itself a renaming of the earlier concept "Rutplatåland" (Square plateau land).)
6. Plains with residual hills of Dalarna
7. Undulating hilly land of central Sweden

== Phytogeography and soils ==
From the south the entrance to the Norrland terrain is not only seen in the relief but in the vast and contiguous boreal forests that extend north of it. These forests are known in Sweden as Norra barrskogsregionen (lit. the northern conifer forest region). The southern boundary of the Norrland terrain was identified as a major phytogeographical boundary by Rutger Sernander. For example, the boundary coincides with the northernmost extension of natural grown oaks. The phytogeographical boundary is not fully sharp as valleys of the Norrland terrain constitute transition zones for vegetation. Till and peat are the overwhelmingly commonest soil types.

== Gallery ==
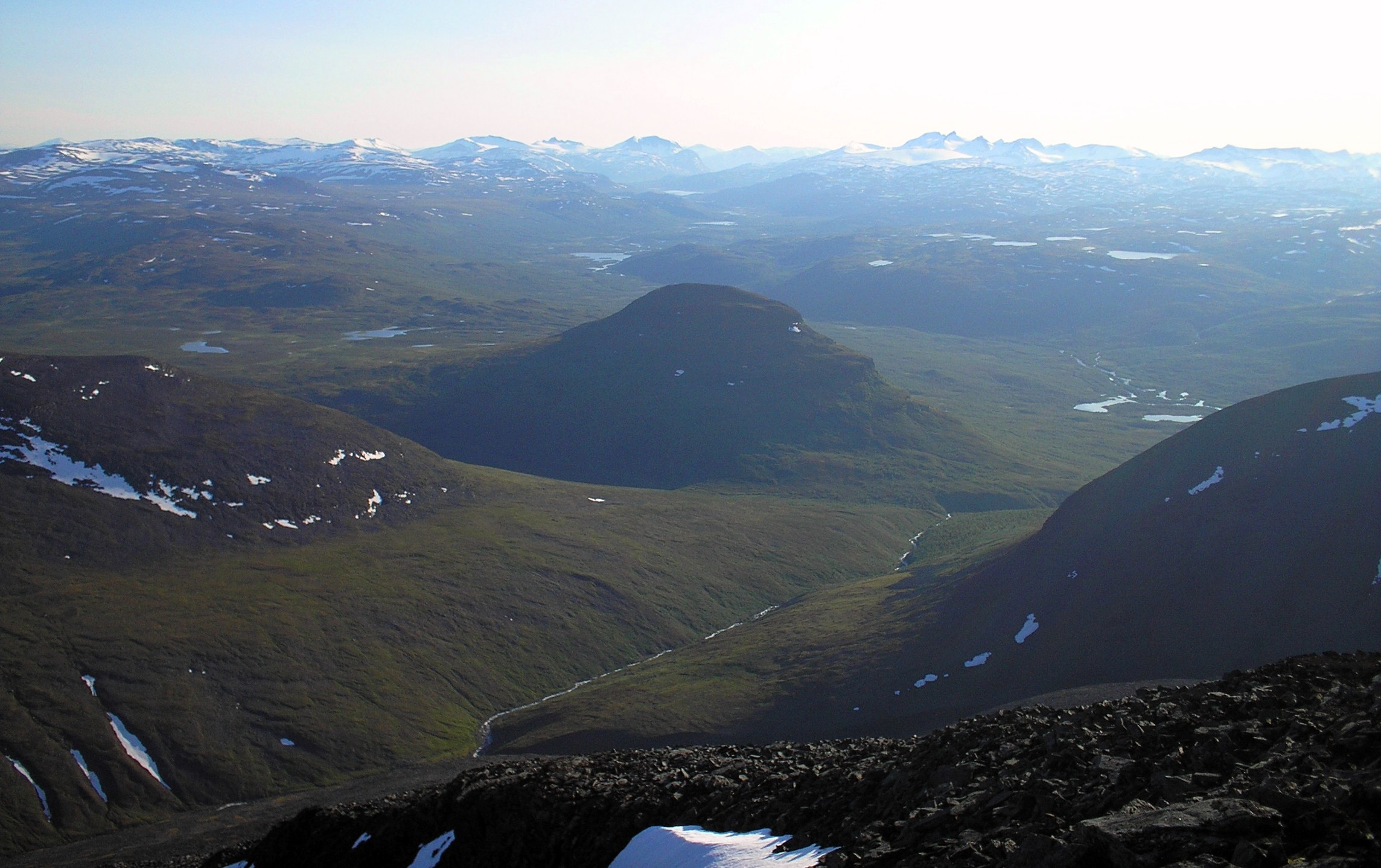
Highlands with well developed valleys above 500 m.a.s.l. at the Abisko Alps, Lappland

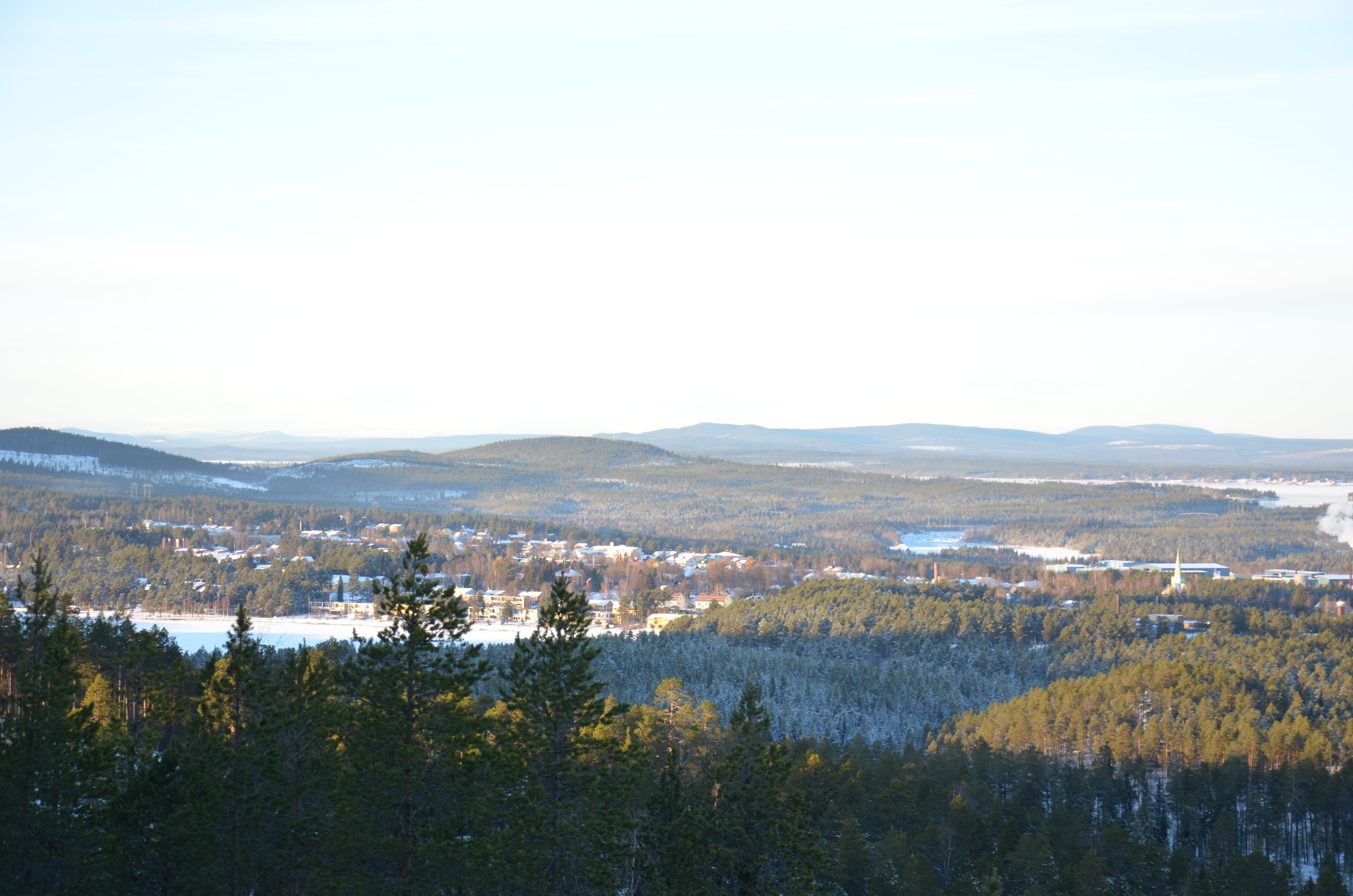
Plains with residual hills of Northern Sweden at Jokkmokk, Lappland

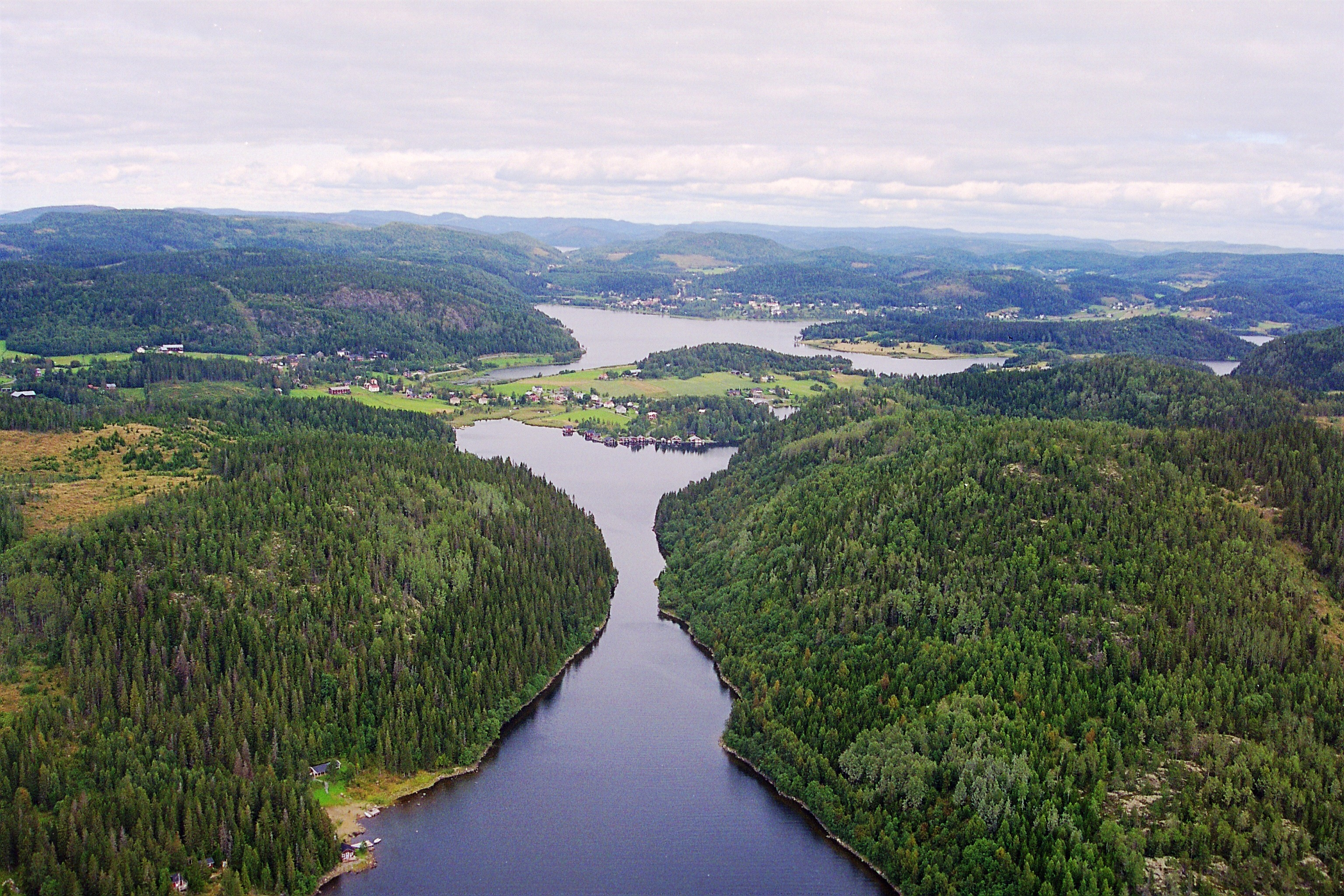
Large scale joint valley landscape at The High Coast, Ångermanland

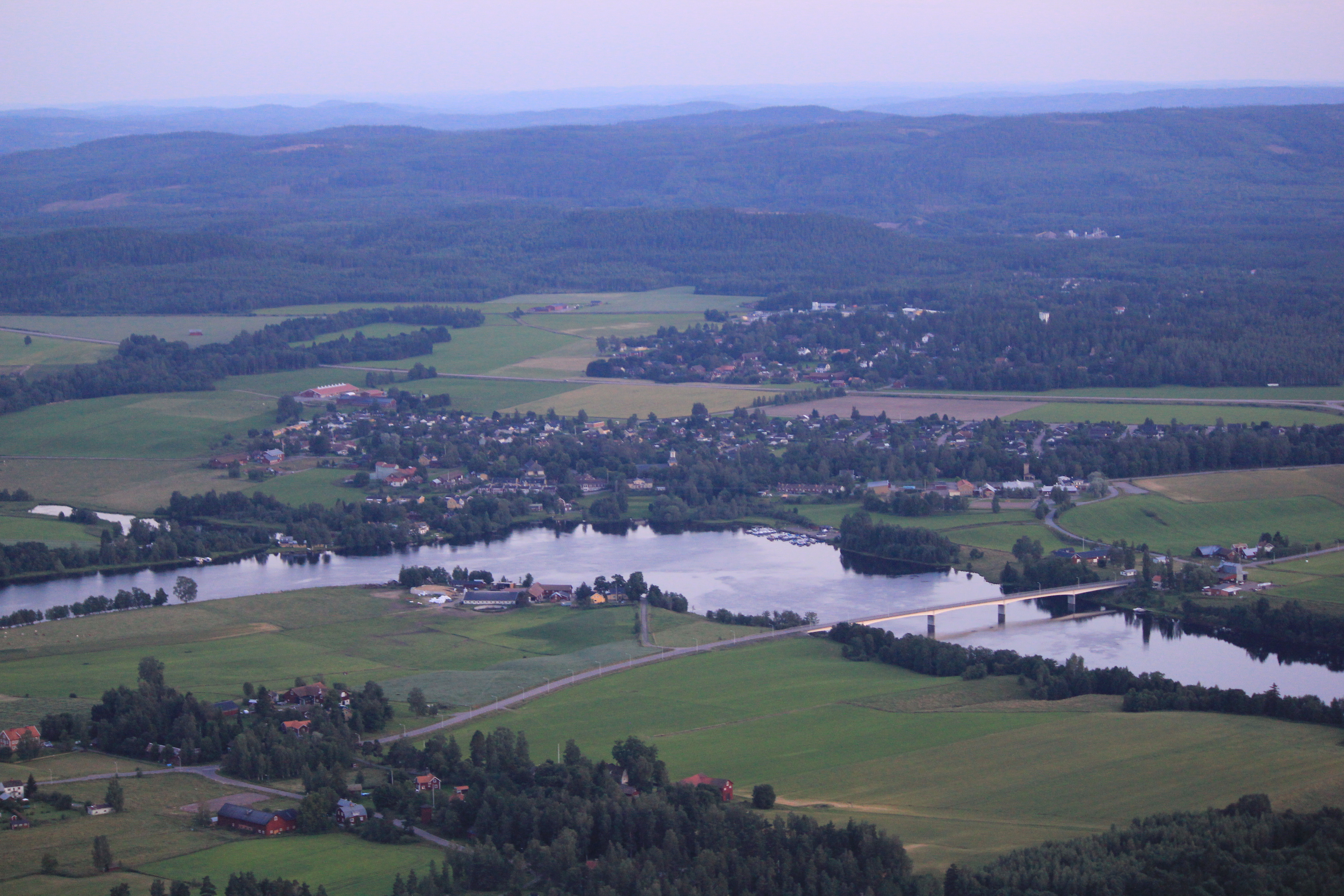
Undulating hilly land of Central Sweden seen at Säter Municipality, Dalarna

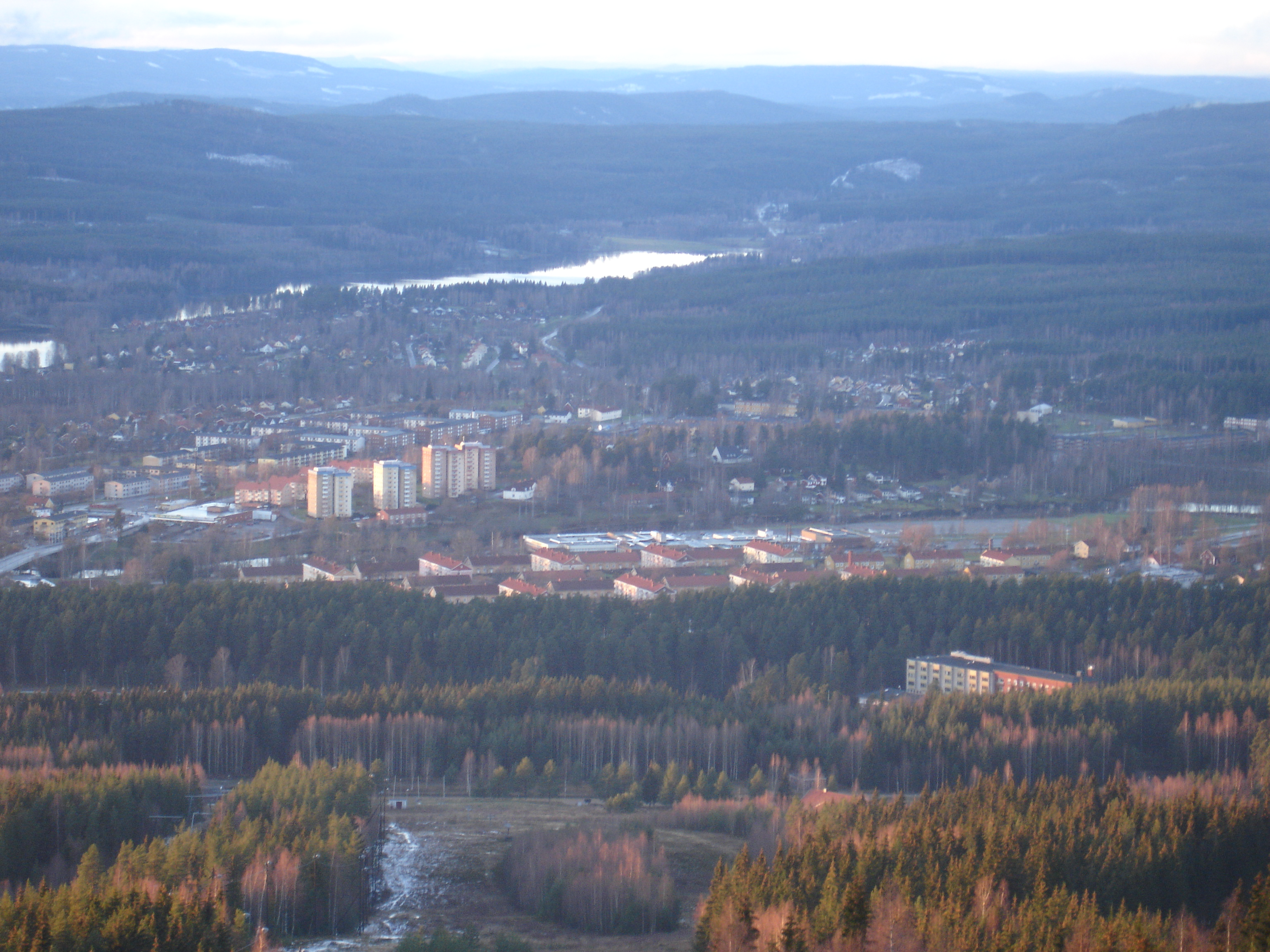
Undulating hilly land of Central Sweden at Hagfors, Värmland

== See also ==
- Central Swedish lowland
- South Swedish highlands
- Sub-Cambrian peneplain
