= Karna Lidmar-Bergström =

Swedish scientist

- Born: 1940 (age 85–86)
- Citizenship: Sweden
- Education: Lund University
- Known for: Study of Pre-Quaternary landforms
- Awards: Björkénska priset (2006)
- Scientific career
- Fields: Geomorphology
- Workplaces: Lund University; Stockholm University

Karna Lidmar-Bergström (born 1940) is a Swedish geologist and geomorphologist known for her study of Pre-Quaternary landforms in Sweden and Norway. She is an emeritus professor of Stockholm University. In 2004 she was elected into the Royal Swedish Academy of Sciences. In 2018 she was appointed an honorary doctor of the University of Gothenburg Faculty of Science.

== Life ==
Karna Lidmar-Bergström was born in 1940. She studied at Lund University under professor Karl-Erik Bergsten. Later Mats Åkesson served as her unofficial doctoral advisor, as the tutor system did not exist at that time.

Lidmar-Bergström is a geologist and geomorphologist known for her study of Pre-Quaternary landforms in Sweden and Norway. Lidmar-Bergström studied the flint distribution and how the Swedish landmasses were formed, and was the discoverer of a previously unknown north–south current now called the Kattegatt current. Lidmar-Bergström also invented a method she called Stratigraphical Landscape Analyses, based on her research in southern Sweden. She was responsible for the preparation of geomorphological maps for the National Atlas of Sweden.

In 2004 she was elected into the Royal Swedish Academy of Sciences. She is an emeritus professor of Stockholm University. In 2018, when she had already been retired for several years, she was appointed an honorary doctor of the University of Gothenburg Faculty of Science. The award was presented by Professor Katarina Abrahamsson from the Department of Marine Sciences.

== Notable publications ==
- 1982. Pre-Quaternary Geomorphological Evolution in Southern Fennoscandia. Meddelanden från Lunds Universitets Geografiska Institution, Avhandlingar, 91 /Sveriges Geologiska Undersökning Serie C, 785.
- 1996. Long term morphotectonic evolution in Sweden. Geomorphology, 16, 33–59.
