= Muddus plains =

Landscape in northern Sweden

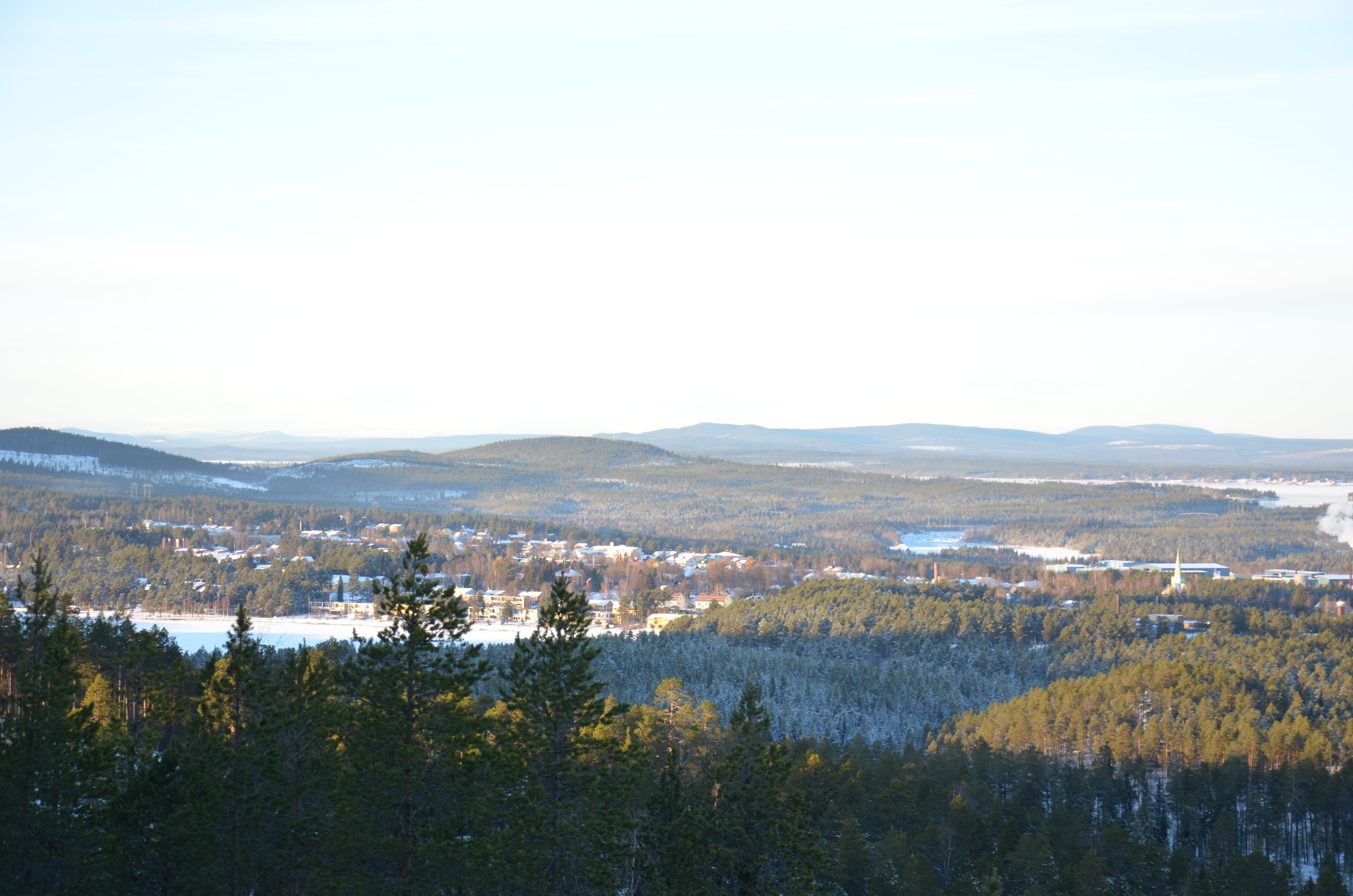
View of the town of Jokkmokk located amidst the Muddus plains. Note the residual hill or inselberg in the background.

The Muddus plains is a landscape type in northern Sweden characterized by its flat topography dotted with inselbergs. The topographic character of the Muddus plains was first described in detail by Walter Wråk in 1908. The Muddus plains are part of the Norrland terrain. The northern lower levels of Southern Norway's Paleic surface are considered to be equivalent to the Muddus plains.

The plains formed in connection to the uplift of the northern Scandinavian Mountains in the Paleogene. The uplift caused the surface to tilt eastward and incised valleys opened up to the east. This region in to east of the Scandinavian Mountains proper was a tectonically stable region close to a base level where topography evolved to form the Muddus plains. The key processes involved in the formation of the Muddus plain include etching, stripping and pediplanation. The climate under which these processes occurred was likely warm relative to the present. To the south the Muddus plains is considered to be equivalent to the lower levels of the paleic surface in south Norway, meaning that topography is likely to have developed at the same time and level, and by the same processes.

Rivers in the Muddus plains flow mostly towards the east. This contrast with the southeastern direction there rivers turn further downstream outside the Muddus plains and has been explained by the inference that the river courses in the Muddus plains reflect an ancient drainage pattern contrary to the Late Cenozoic river courses close to the Gulf of Bothnia.

== See also ==
- Inselbergs of Finnish Lapland
- Muddus National Park
