= Karl-Erik Bergsten =

Swedish geographer

- Born: 27 July 1909; Risinge församling, Östergötland
- Died: 17 May 1990 (aged 80)
- Citizenship: Sweden
- Education: Lund University
- Known for: Studies on deglaciation, Bergslagen, demographics
- Scientific career
- Fields: Human geography Physical geography Quaternary geology
- Workplaces: University of Gothenburg; Lund University

Karl-Erik Bergsten (1909–1990) was a Swedish geographer. When professor Fredrik Enquist retired in 1952 Bergsten assumed his chair as geography professor in University of Gothenburg. Bergsten held that position until 1958 when he moved to the University of Lund being succeeded by Sten Rudberg in Göteborg.
