= Falbygden =

Coordinates: 58°11′N 13°39′E

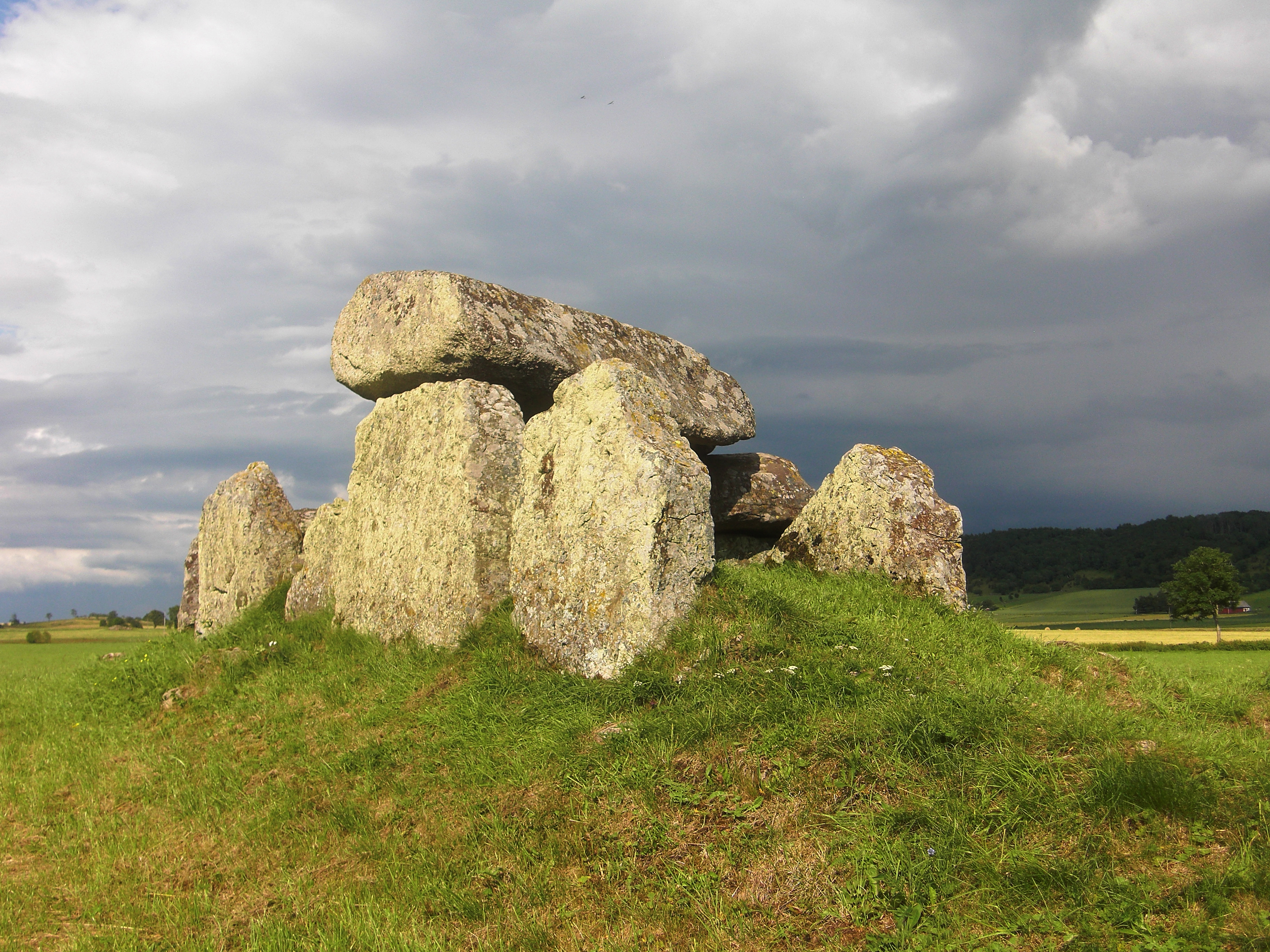
A passage grave in Luttra in Falbygden, Sweden

Falbygden is a geographical area, centered at the town of Falköping in Västergötland, in southwestern Sweden, and covered mostly by farmland. Most of the area belongs to Falköping Municipality and the west part of Tidaholm Municipality. In medieval times the area belonged to the hundreds Frökind, Gudhem, Vartofta, and Vilske. It is known for its geology, flora and megalithic culture.

== Neolithic period in Falbygden ==
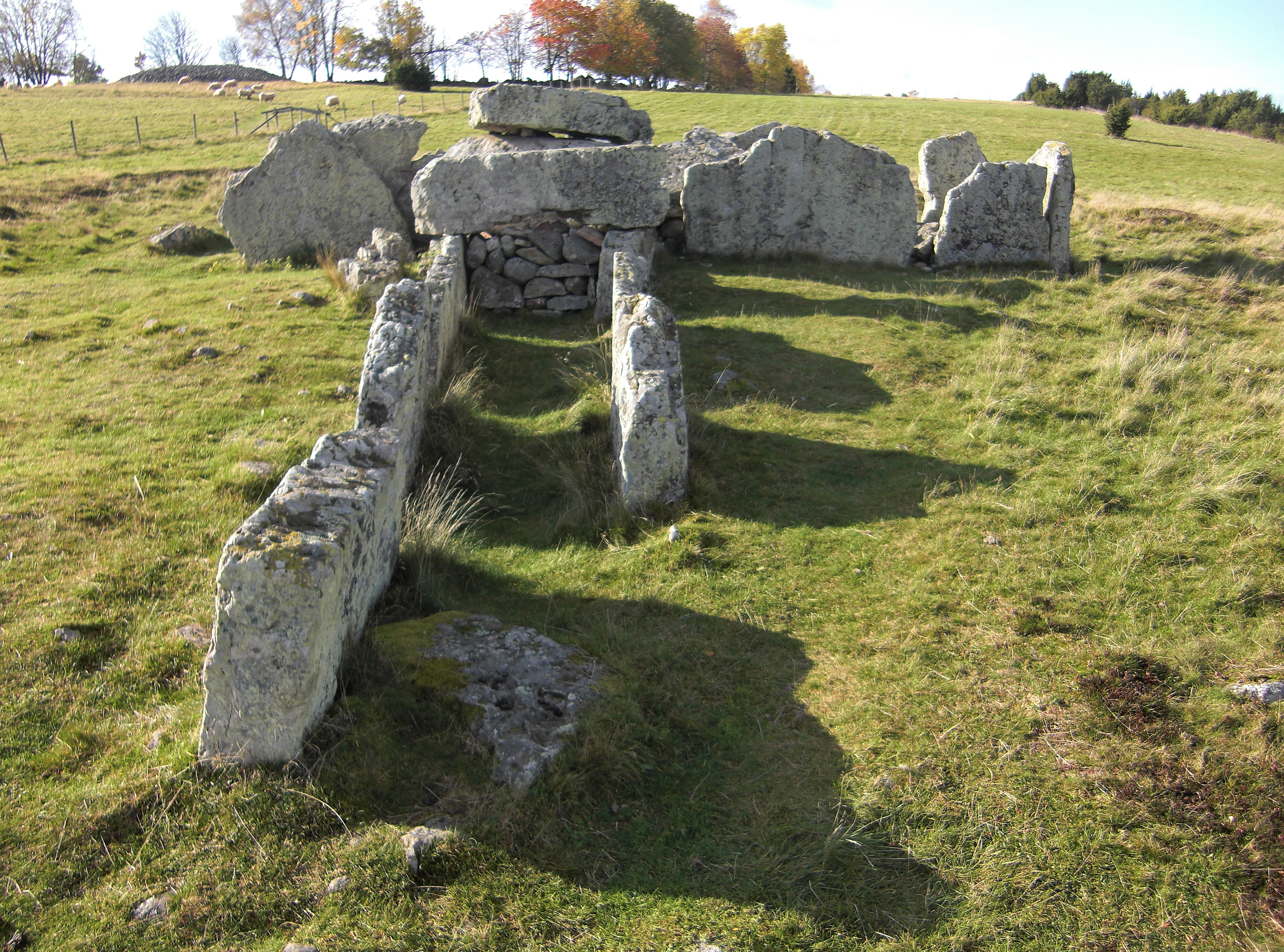
The Neolithic passage grave Girommen at Ekornavallen, Hornborga parish, Falbygden

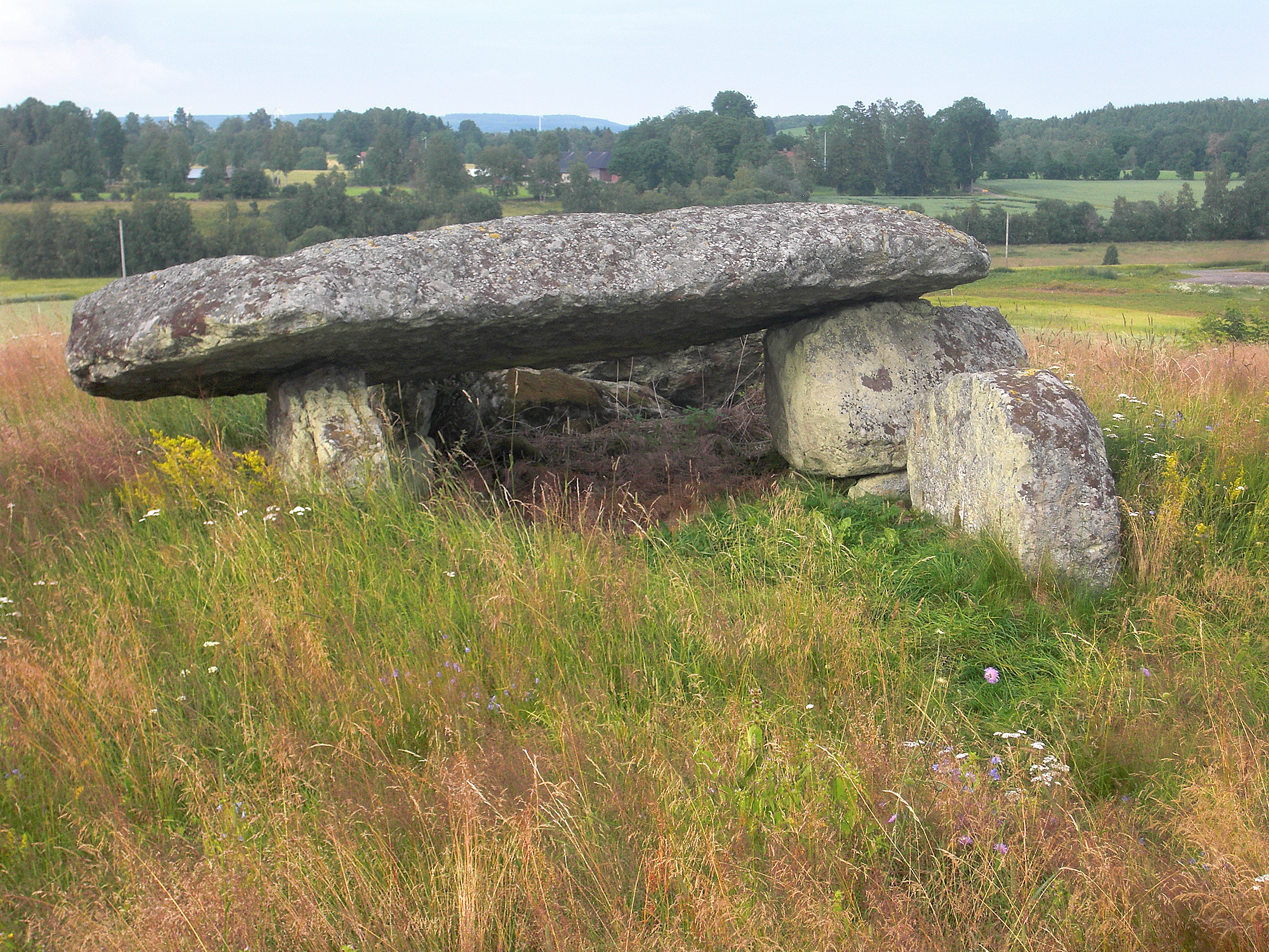
A passage grave in Vårkumla parish

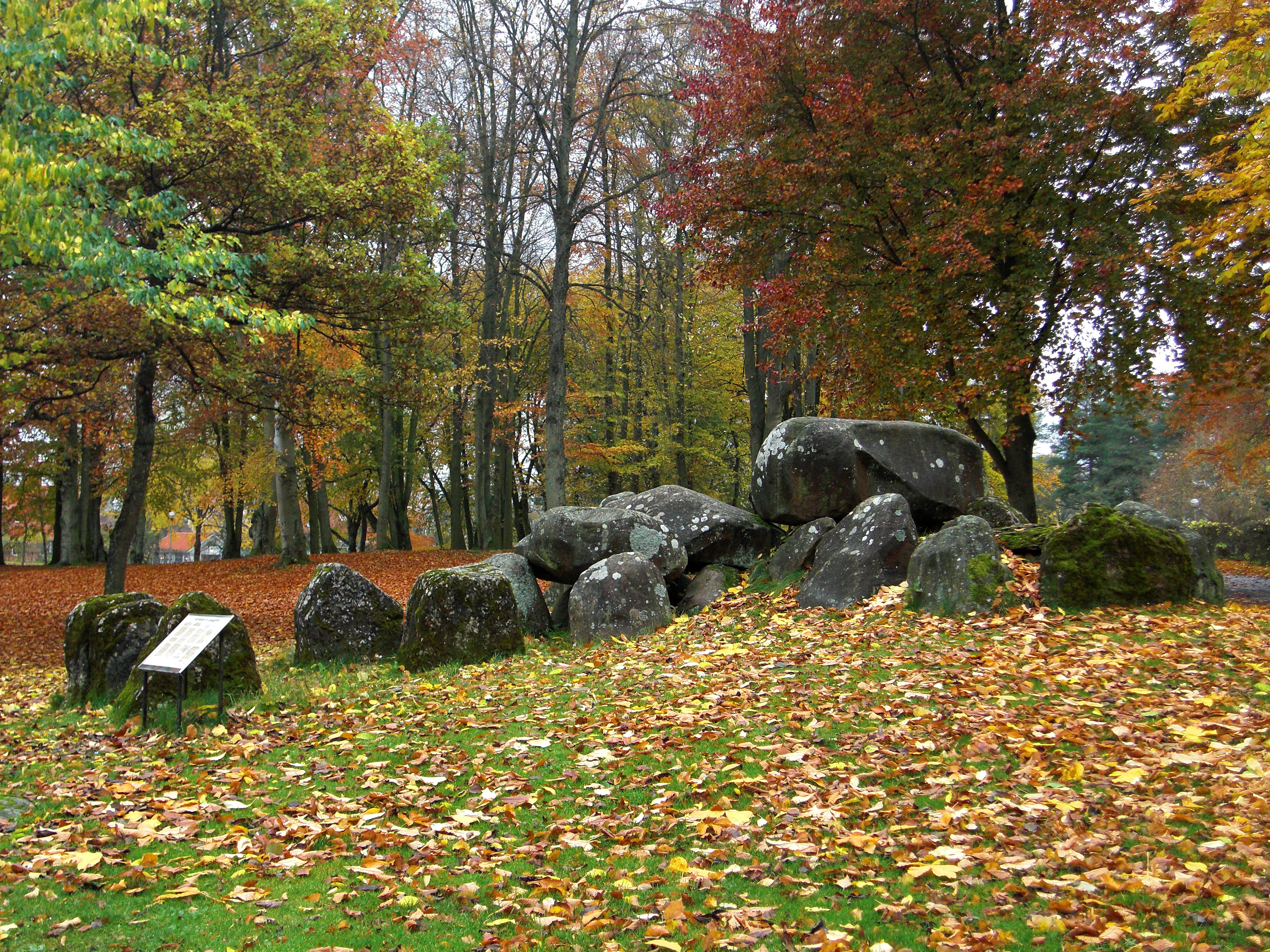
The passage grave Kyrkerör in Falköping

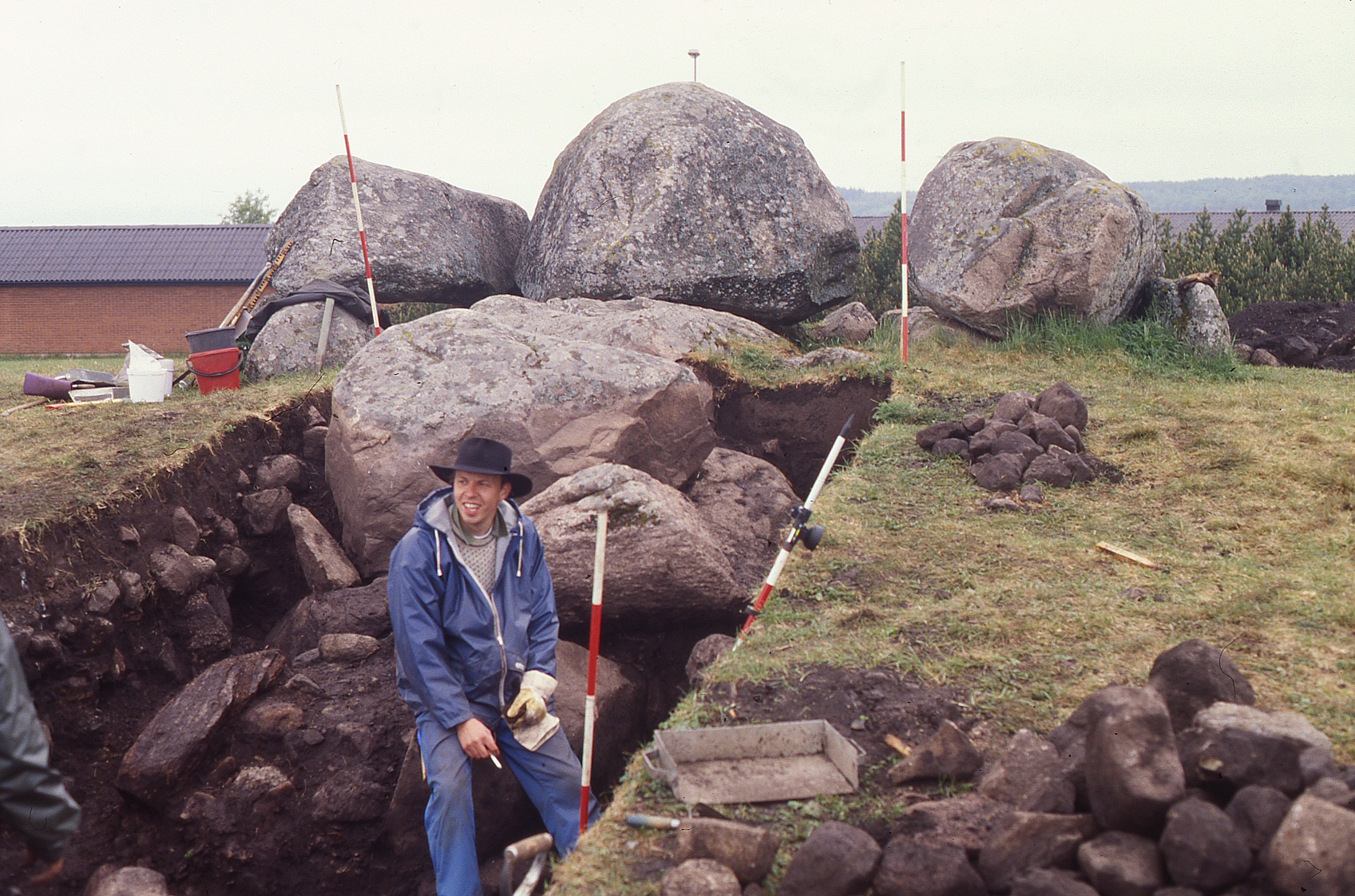
1994 archaeological excavation of the passage grave Hjälmarsrör

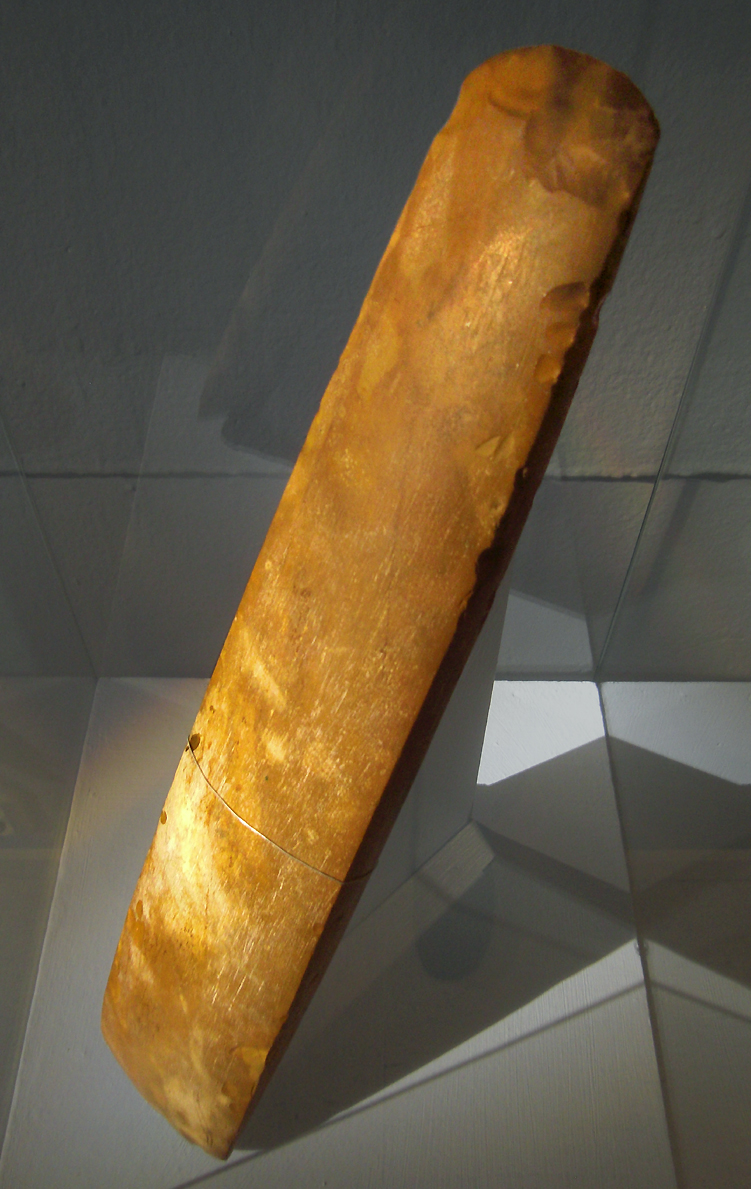
Neolithic thin-butted flint axe, 45.8 cm long, from Segerstad

== Iron Age ==
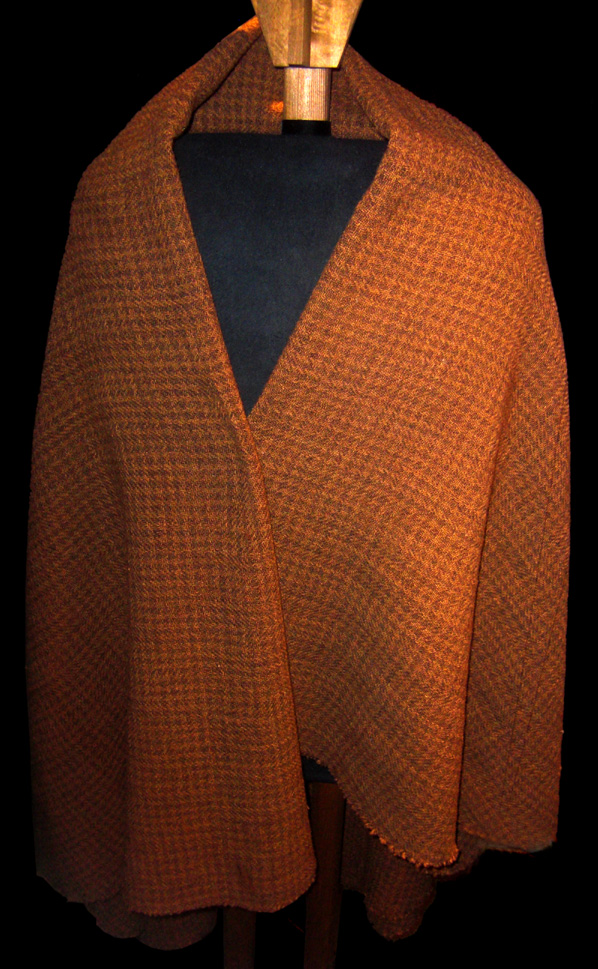
Replica of the Pre Roman Iron Age Gerum Cape found in a bog on the table mountain Gerumsberget, Falbygden

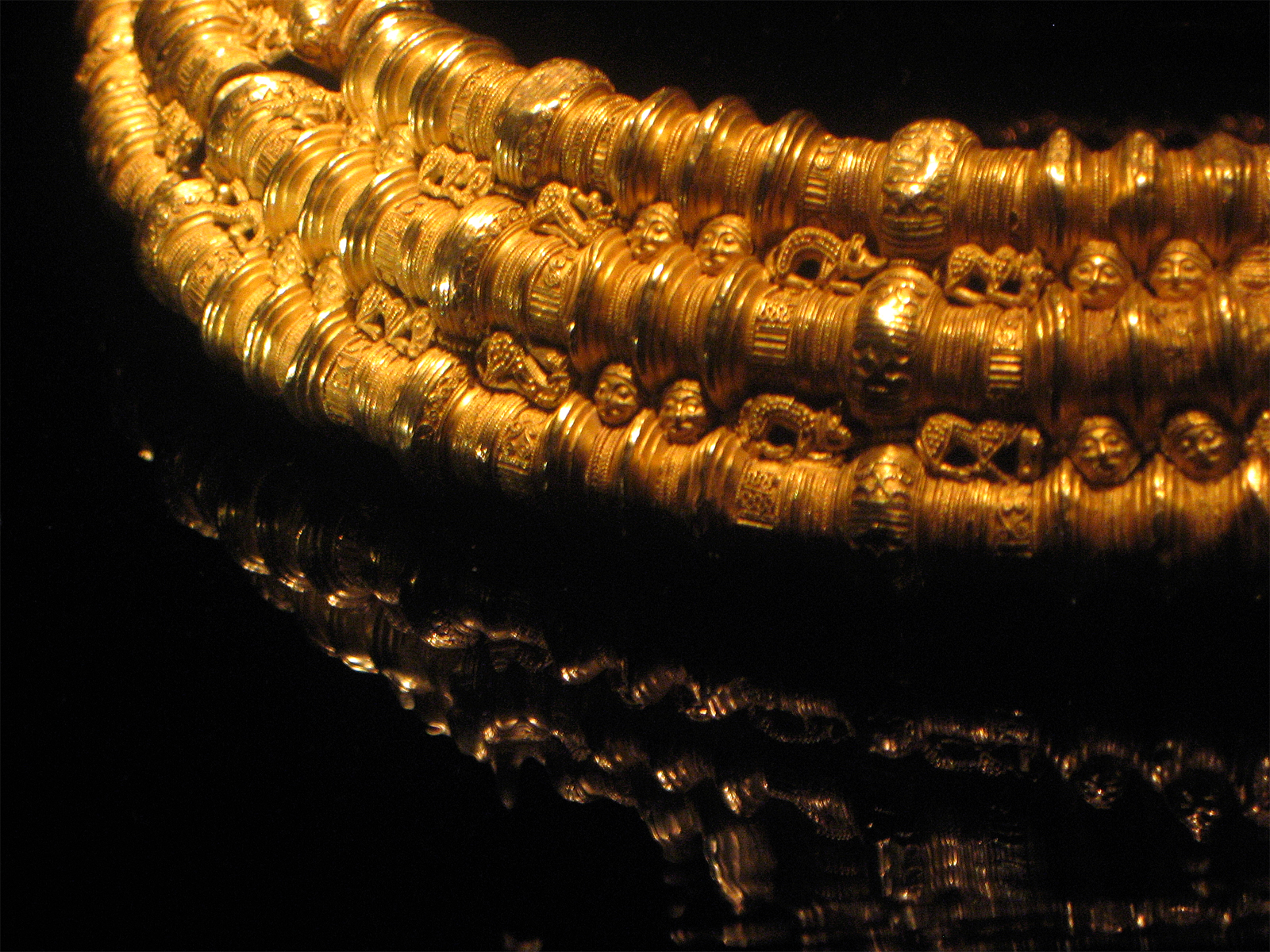
Migration Period golden collar from the slopes of the table mountain Ålleberg

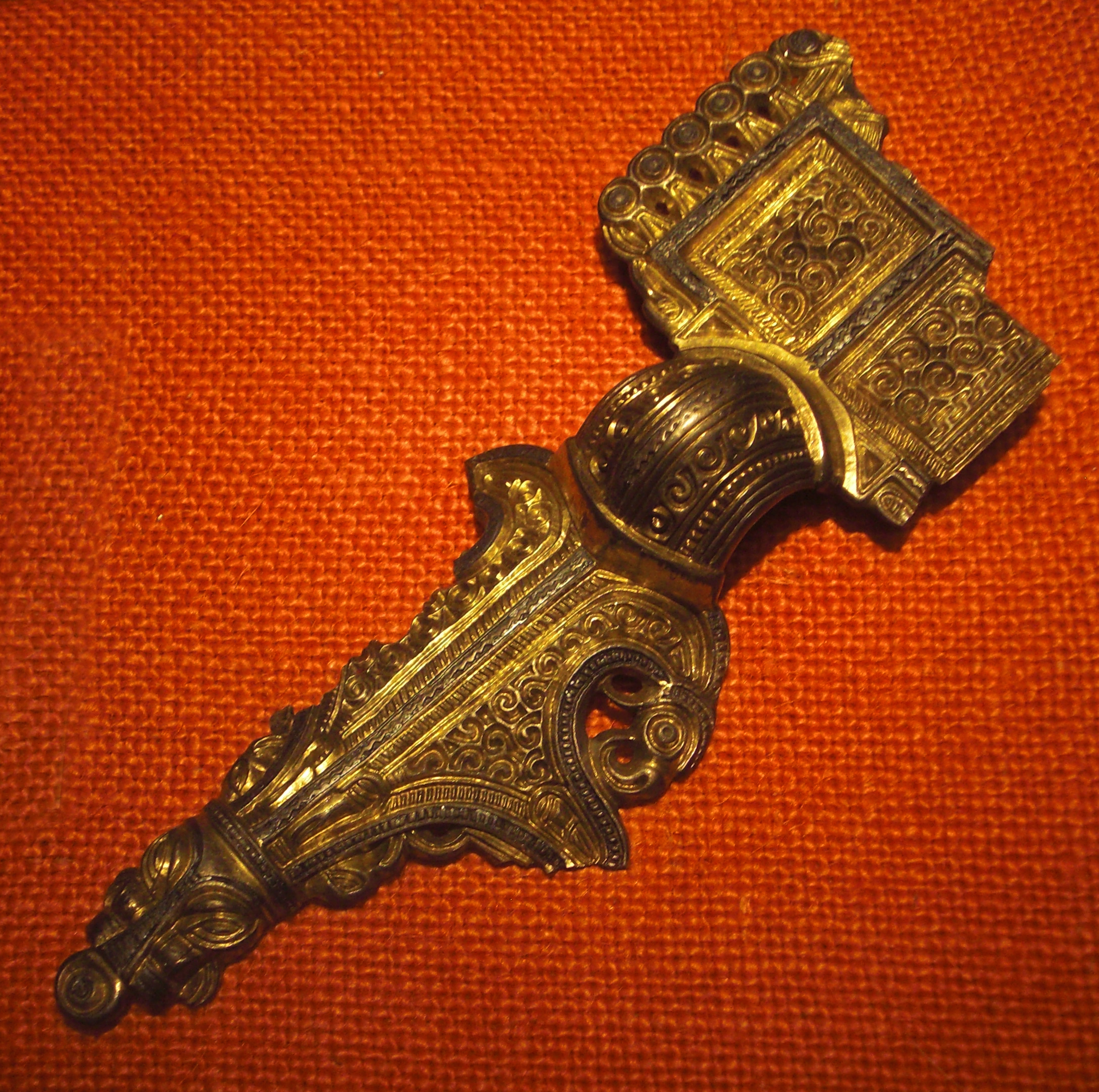
A Migration Period fibula from Trävattna, western part of Falbygden

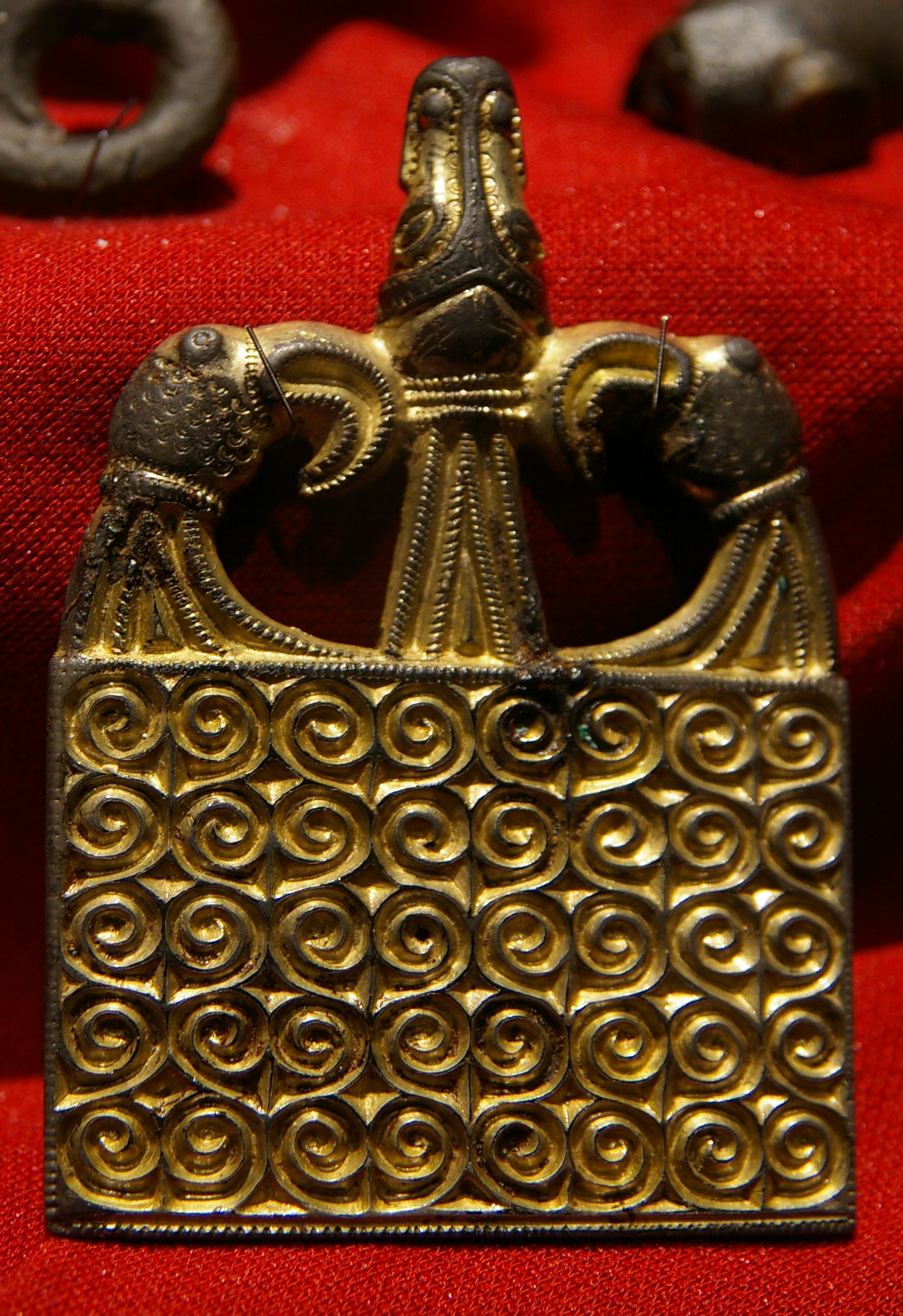
Golden throat of a Migration Period scabbard from Finnestorp on the western border of Falbygden

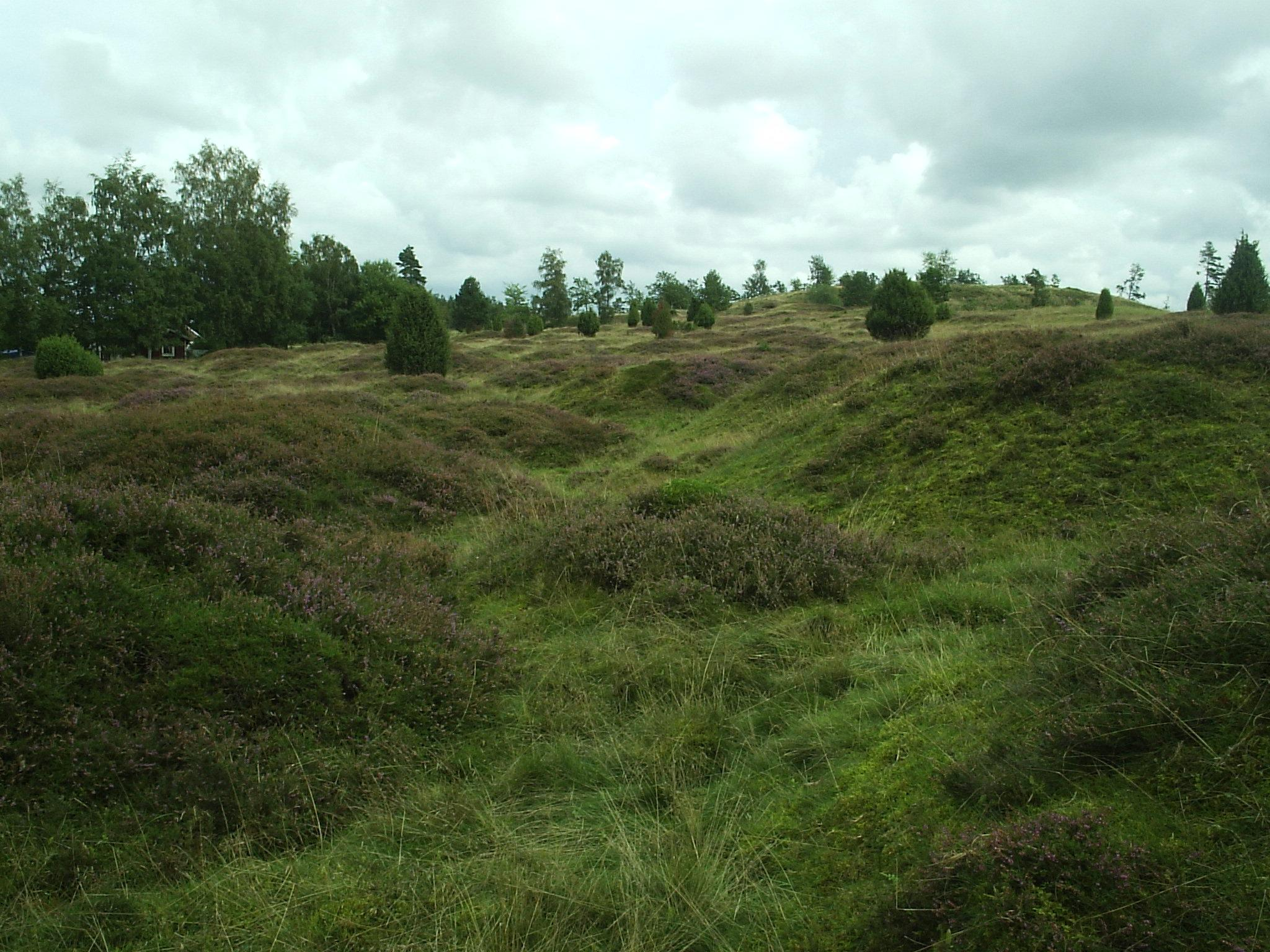
The Dimbo gravefield is the largest Iron Age necropolis in Västergötland.

== Medieval Falbygden ==
The Falbygden area has many medieval churches, since almost every parish in the area had a Romanesque church built in the late 11th, 12th, or early 13th century.

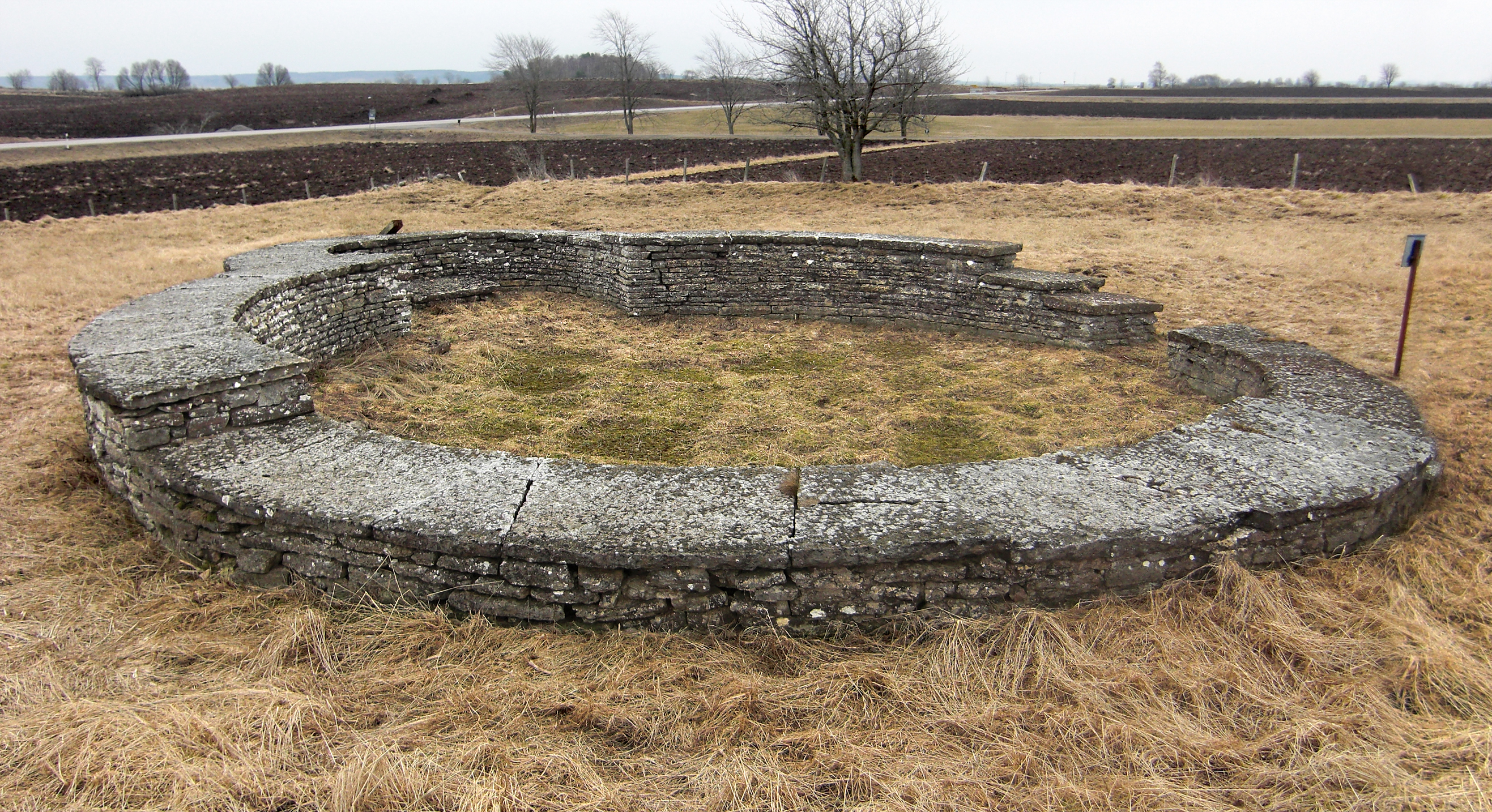
Ruin of the Romanesque rotunda, Agnestad church, just outside Falköping, Falbygden

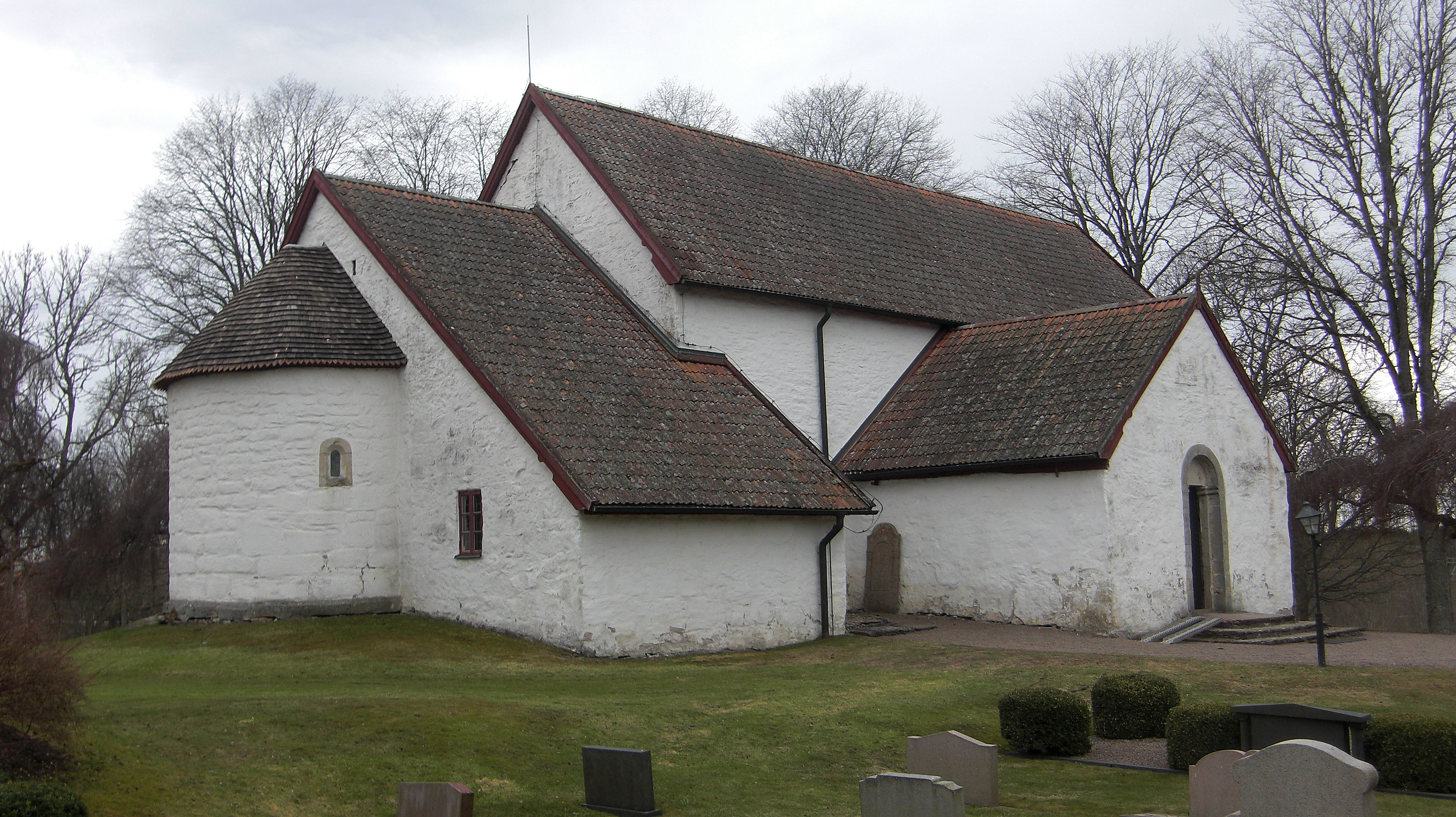
Gökhem Church is a Romanesque church with apse, dated to 1077.

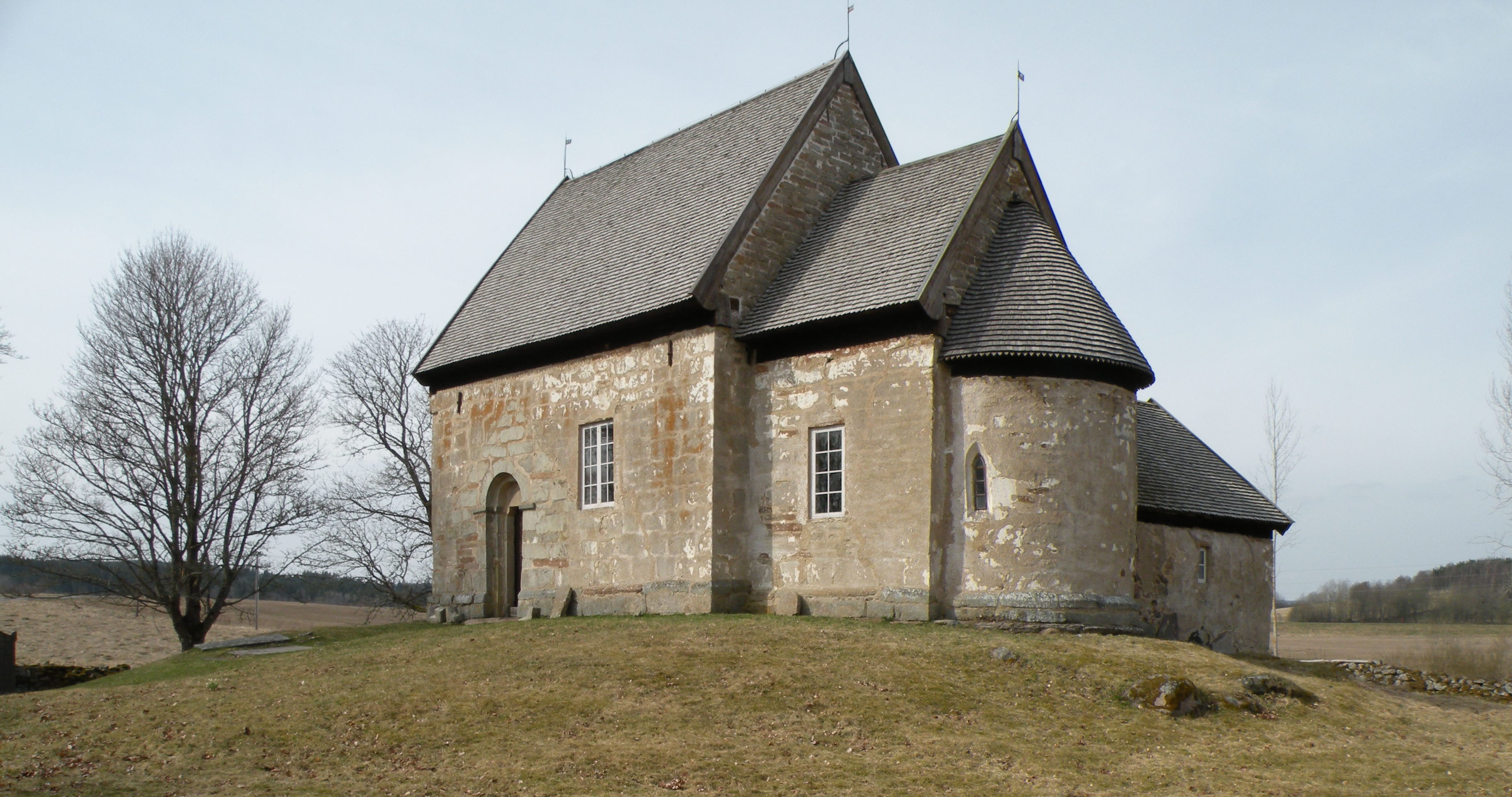
Suntak old church, another Romanesque church in Falbygden

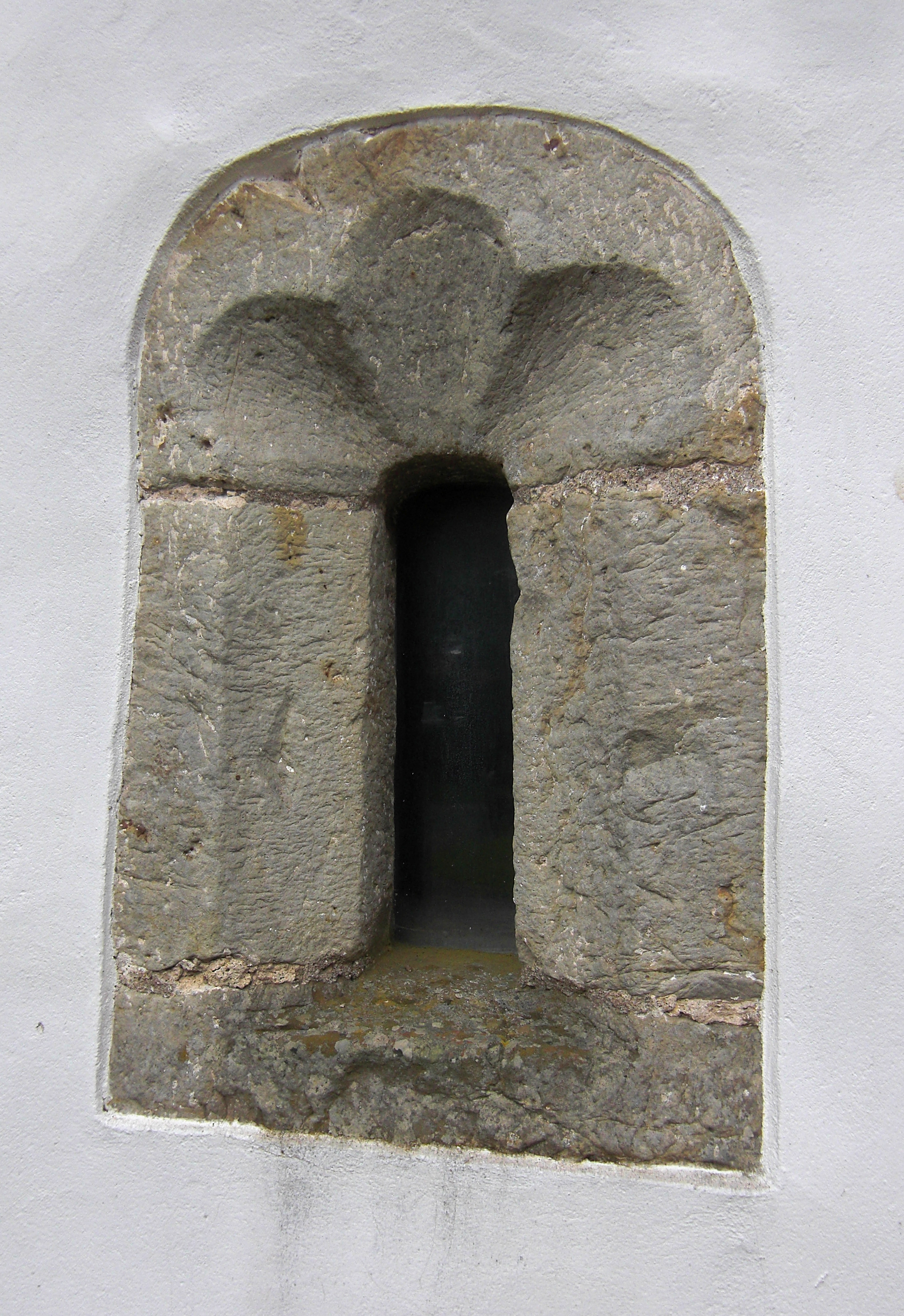
Romanesque church window in Marka church

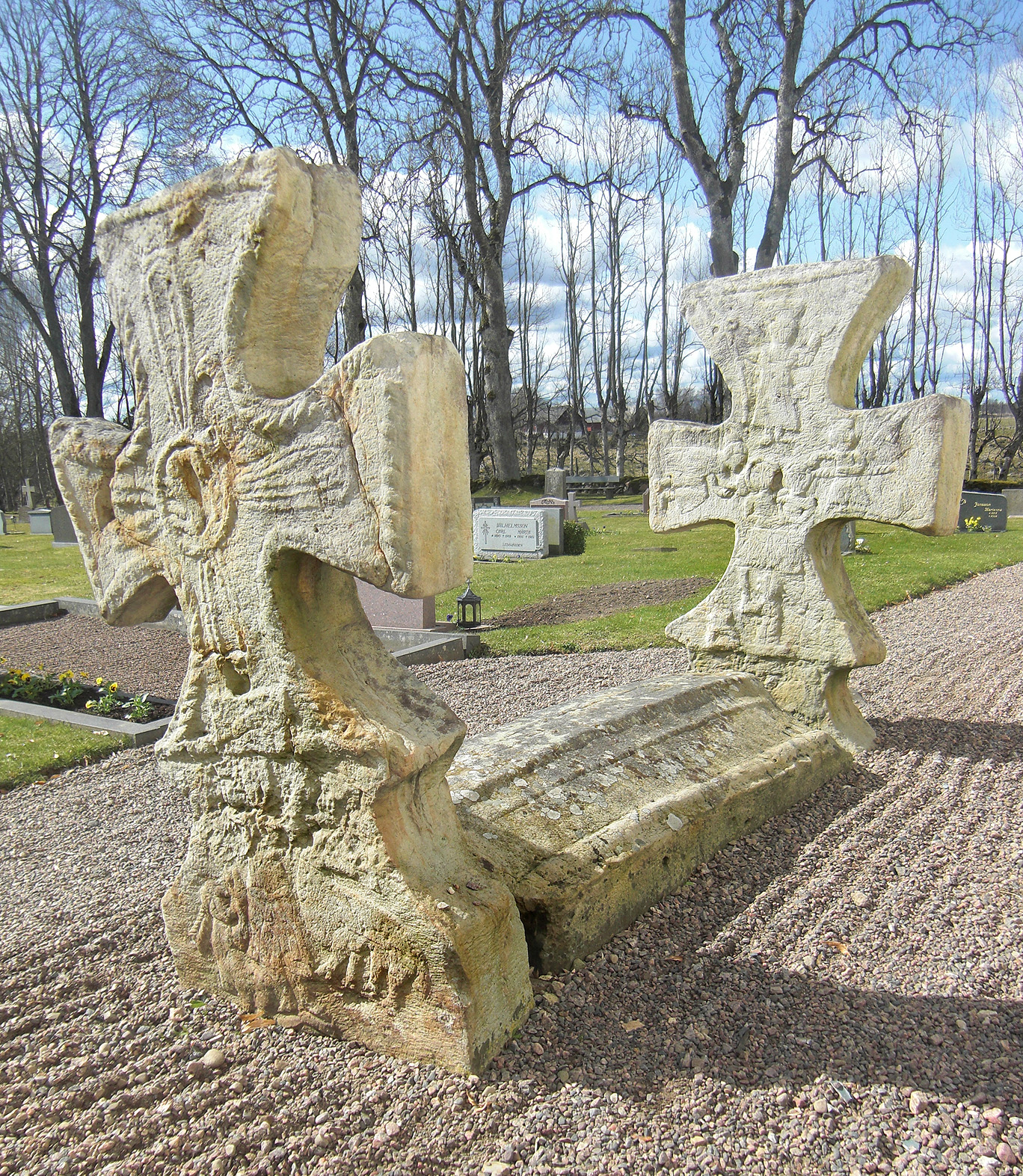
Romanesque tomb at the medieval church of Kinneved

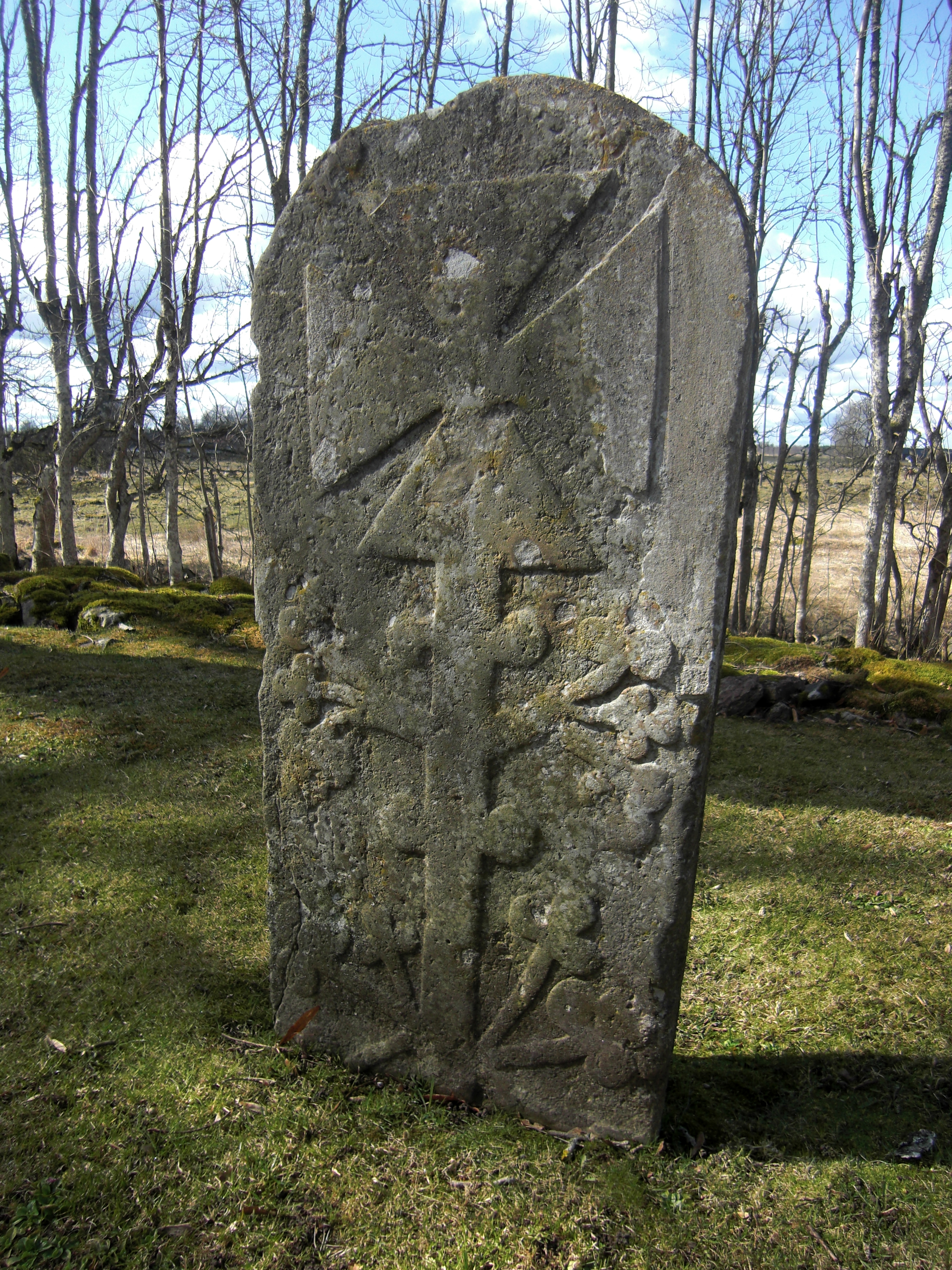
Romanesque grave slab from Kvinnevad church

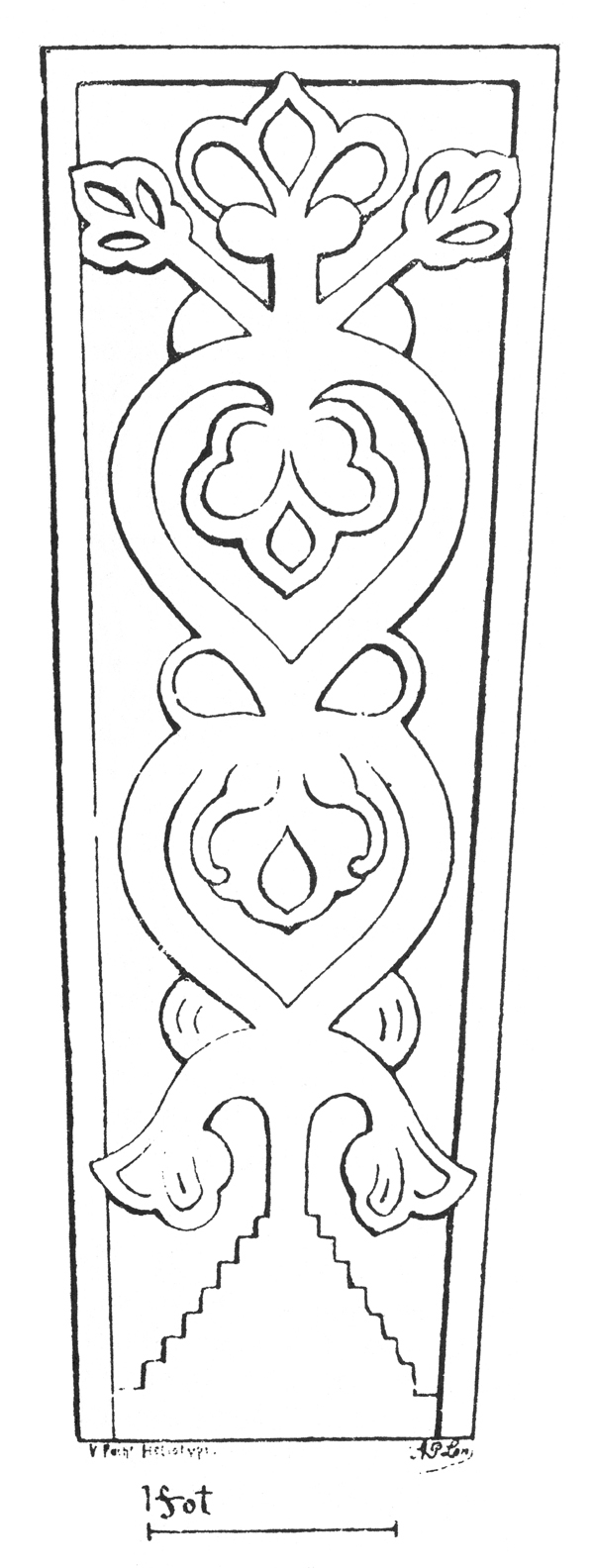
Drawing of Romanesque grave slab from Suntak old church

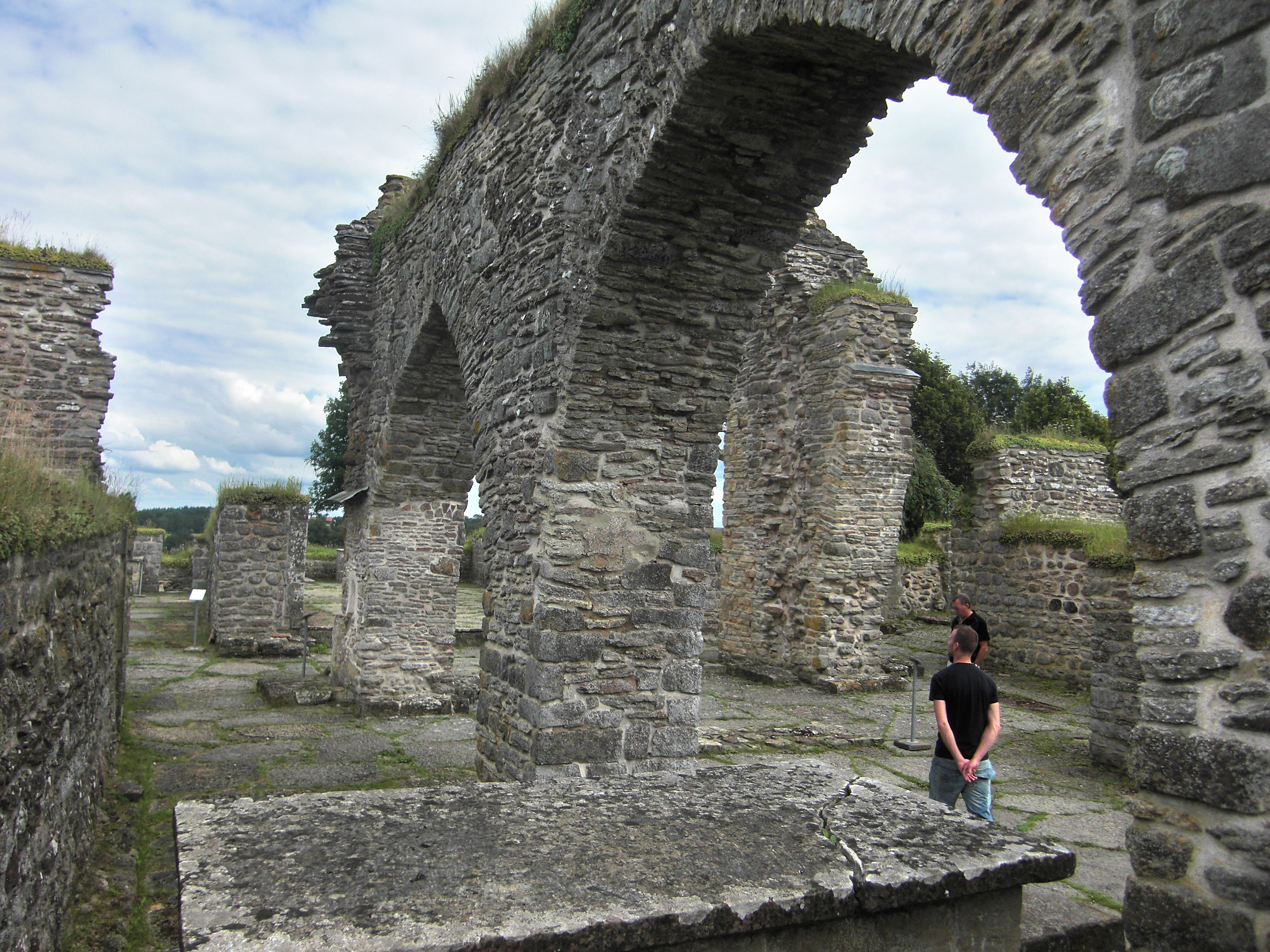
Ruins of Gudhem Abbey

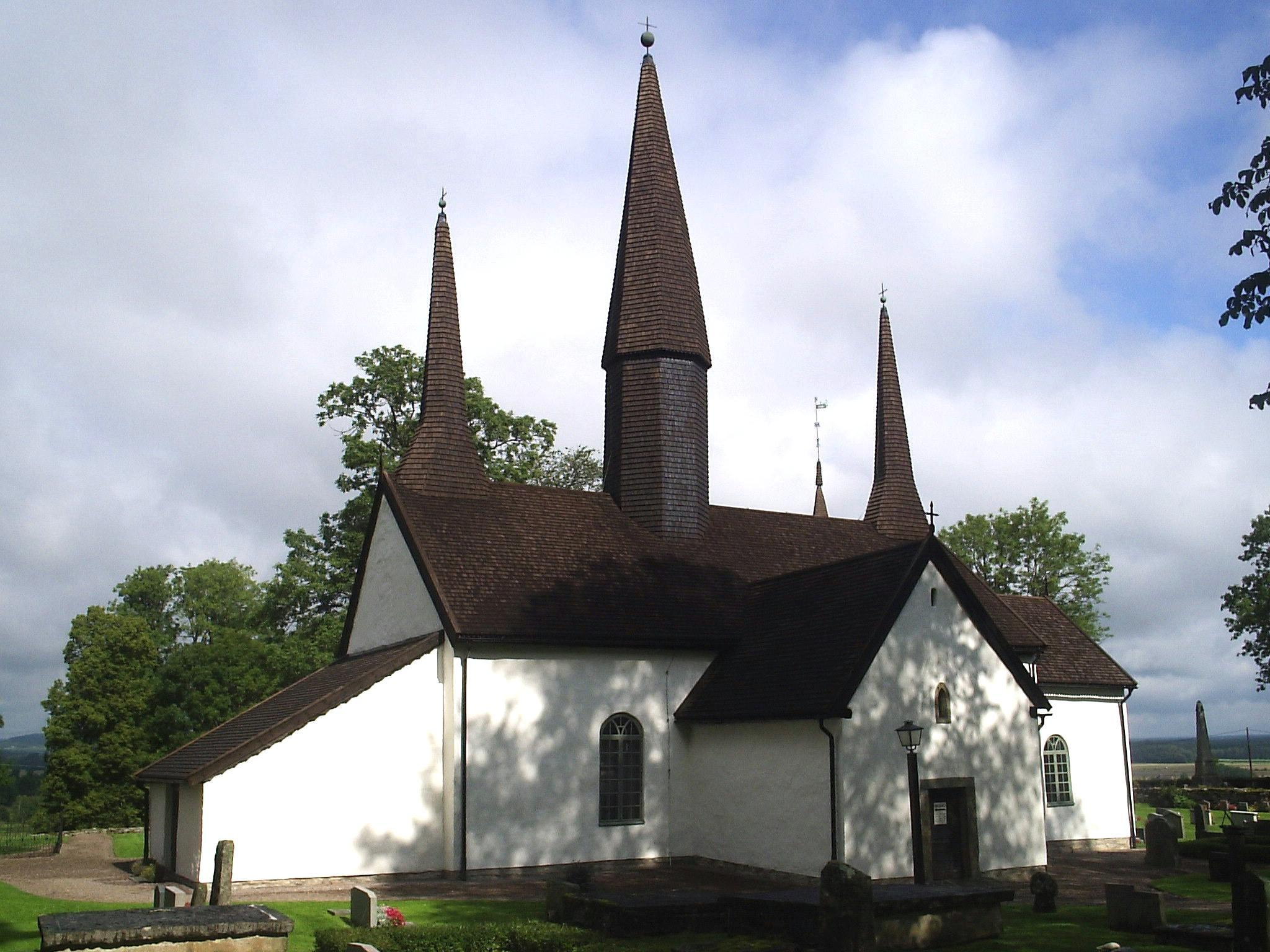
Kungslena church

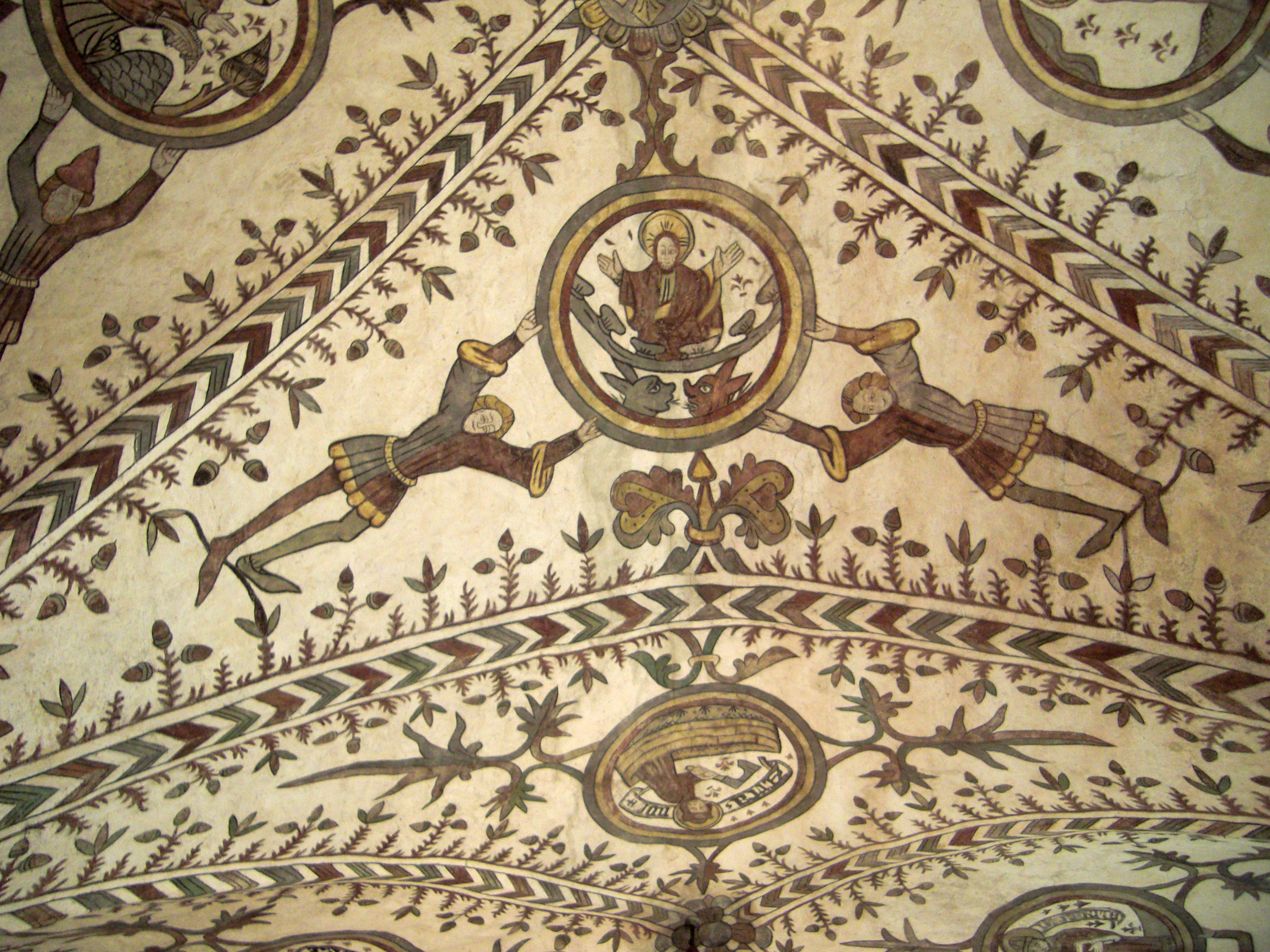
Late medieval ceiling paintings from Gökhem Church

== Museums in Falbygden ==
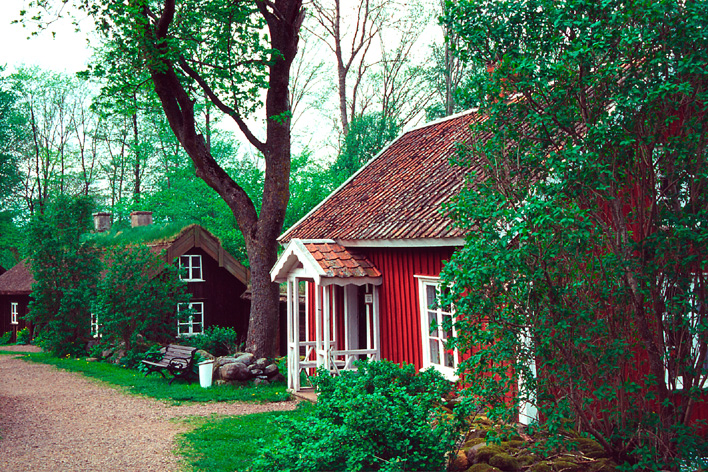
Åsle Tå, Falbygden

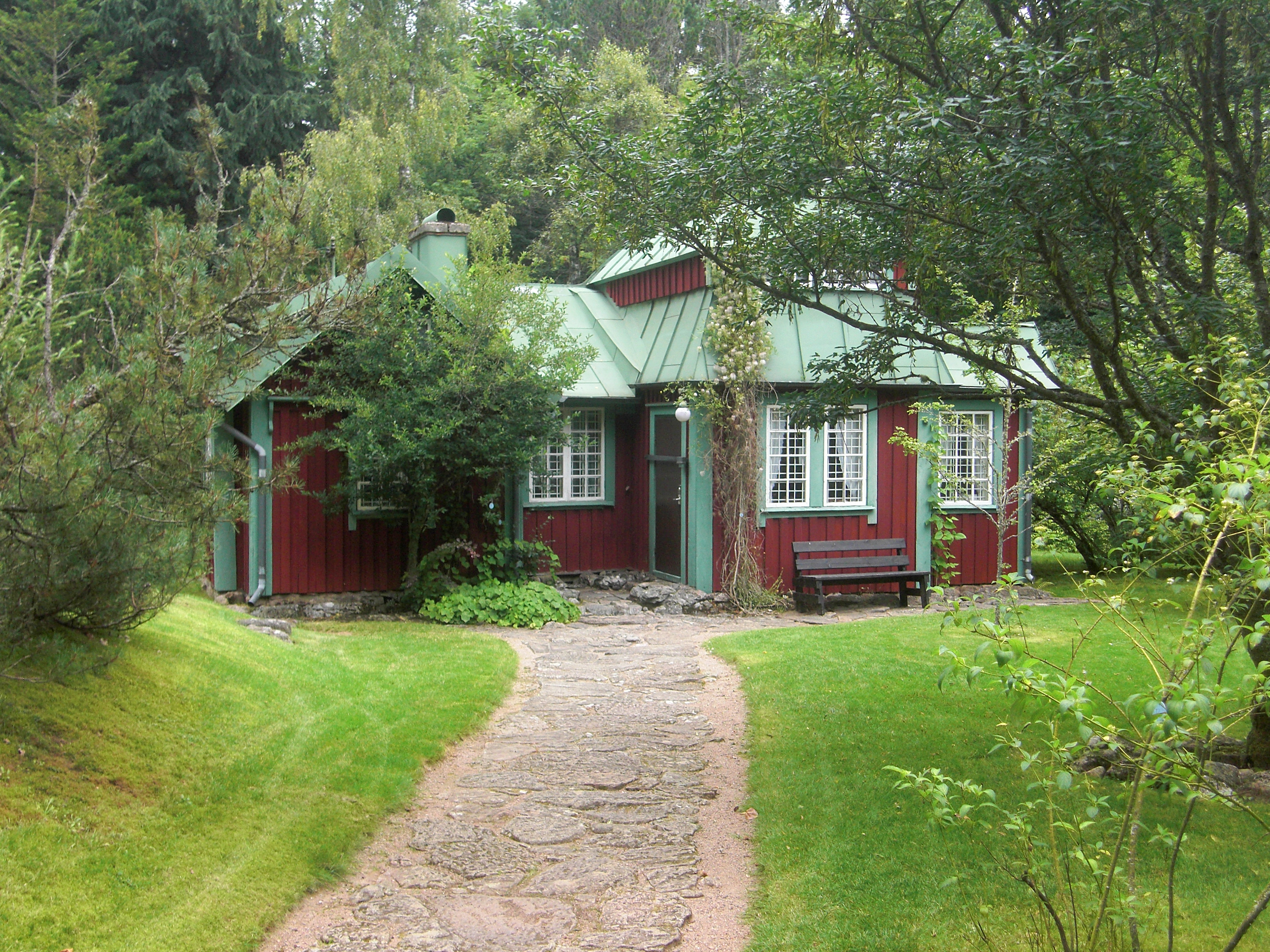
Alphems Arboretum, a garden near Floby in the western part of Falbygden

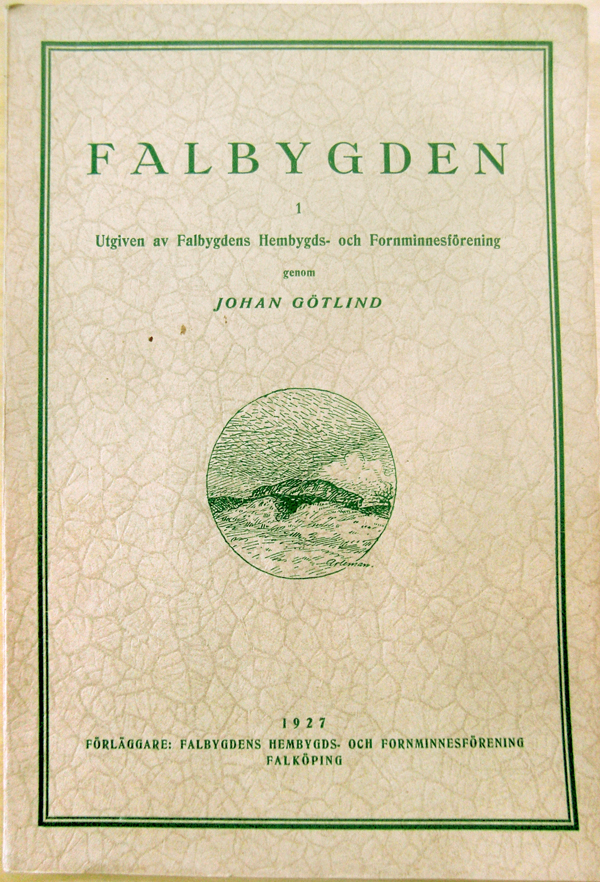
First issue of Falbygden, a periodical for local history, 1927

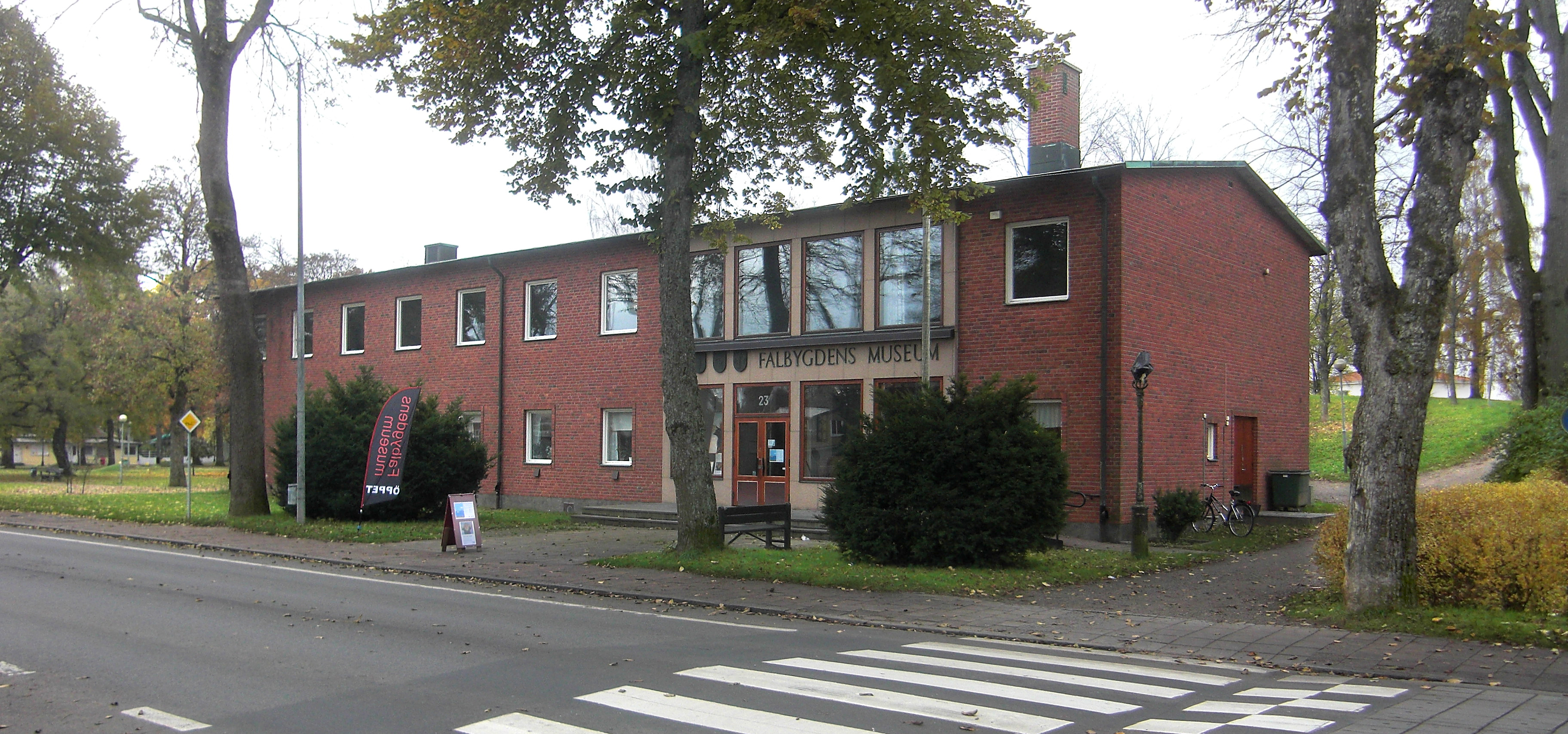
Falbygden Museum in Falköping

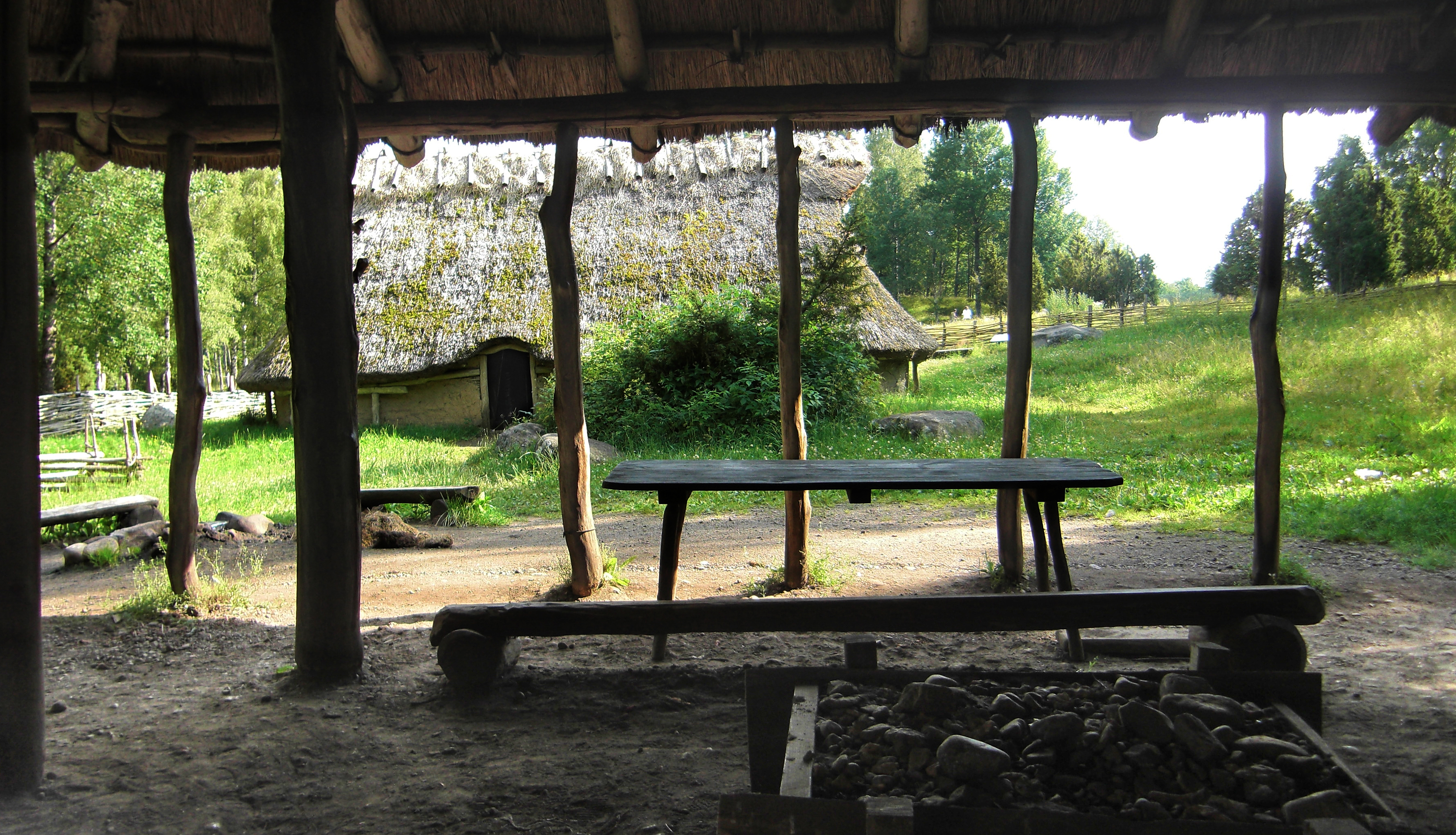
Reconstructed Bronze Age houses at the Ekehagen prehistoric village in the southern part of Falbygden

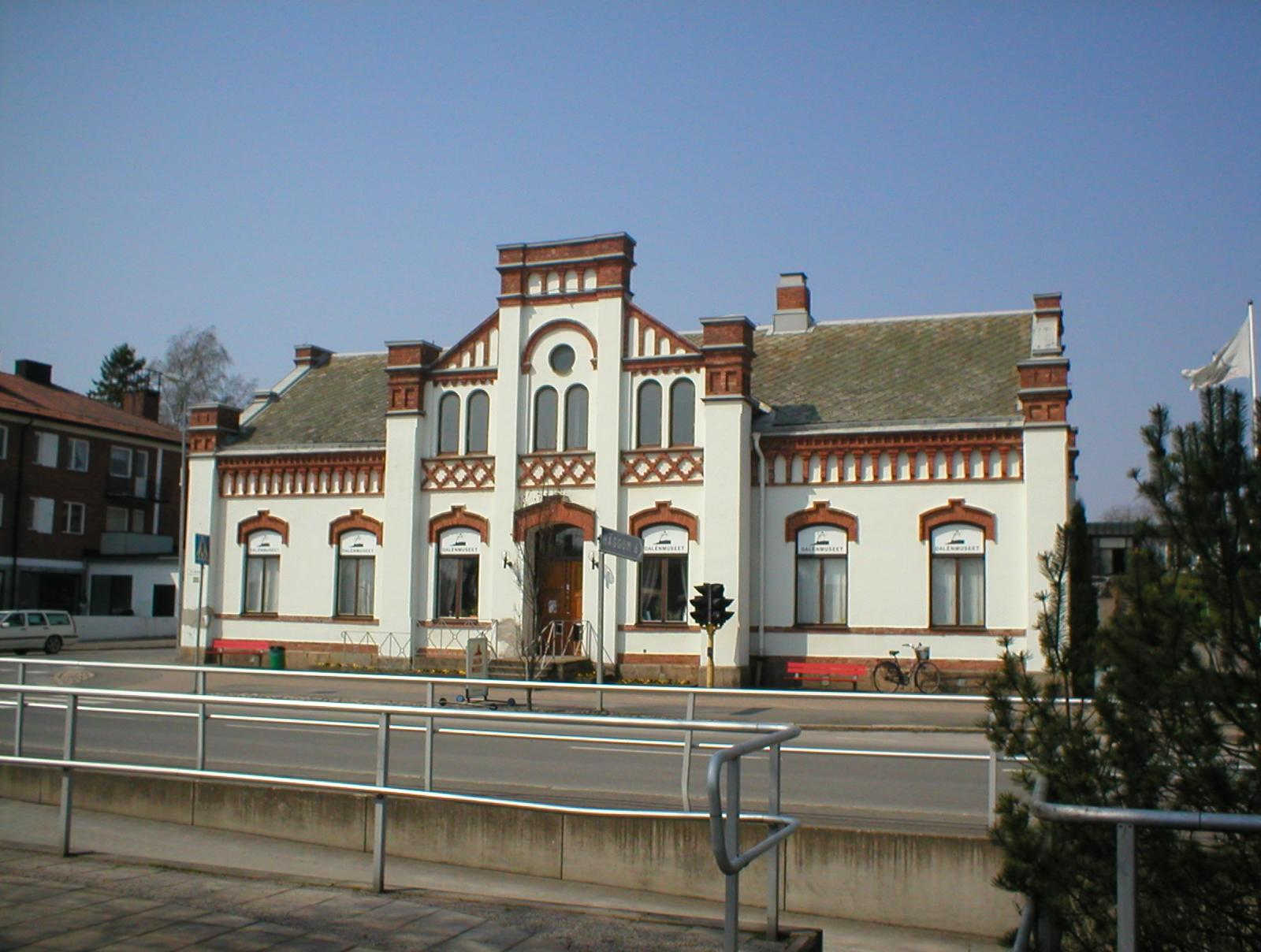
Dalén Museum in Stenstorp

== General sources ==
- Falbygdens Hembygds- och Fornminnesförening, Falbygden (1927-) periodical.
- Falbygdens museum, Forntid på Falbygden (1995).
- Falbygdens museum, se spåren på Falbygden - ....och tusen år till - fortsätter i landskapet (2000).
