= Knights of Ålleberg =

Ghosts of medieval knights

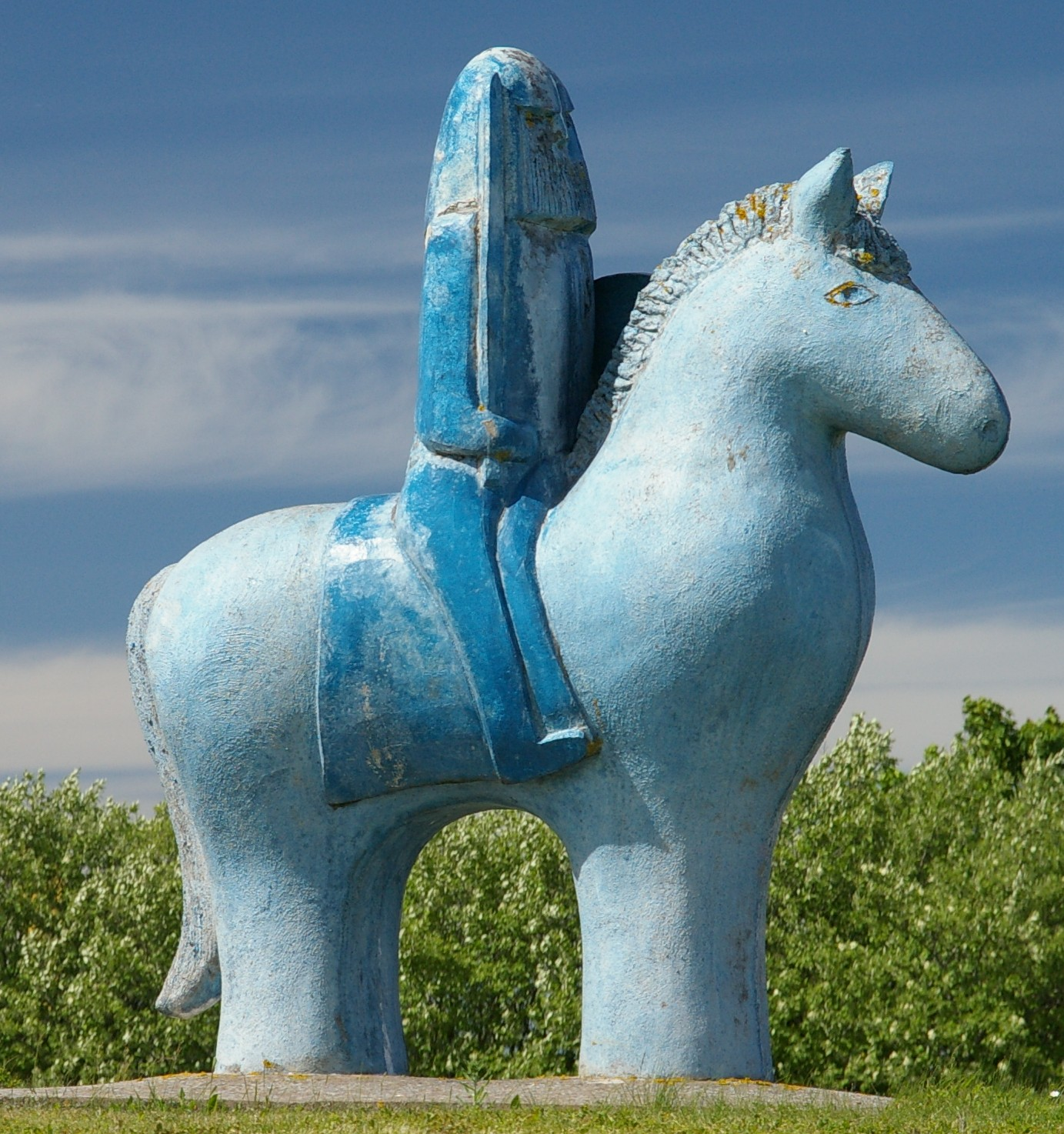
A statue depicting the Knights of Ålleberg

According to Swedish legend, the Knights of Ålleberg are ghosts of twelve knights who died at the Battle of Åsle in a 1389. The legend is an example of the king asleep in mountain motif in folklore.

== Legend ==
The legend concerns knights who died at the Battle of Åsle, sometimes known as the Battle of Falköping, that took place in or around Falköping on 24 February (or August) 1389 between the forces of Albert, King of Sweden and Margaret I of Denmark.

The story says that the ghosts are trapped inside the Ålleberg mountain, waiting for a new war to wake them up so they can fight to save the country. The mountain is also thought to play host to trolls.

In his One Year in Sweden, Horace Marryat recounts one of several versions of the legend current in Falköping, the municipality nearest to Ålleberg, as of his visit in the mid-19th century:

The peasants still have tales of the golden coats of armour worn by the German knights; and pretend, when wandering after nightfall, to have met the spirits of the warriors, especially before time of warfare.

Marryat continues, describing the story of a young man who enters the mountain at the bidding of a mysterious gentleman:

Around the walls of a vast chamber lay sleeping cavaliers, with golden armour hanging above their heads; from behind he heard a sound as of horses in their stables at night time. Though he did walk very softly with his iron-nailed shoes, some of the warriors awoke, and asked, "Is the hour yet come?"

== In literature ==
A short story by August Strindberg titled (in English) "The Golden Helmets in the Alleberg", a humorous tale with abundant references to the history of Sweden, alludes to the legend.

== See also ==
- List of ghosts

== Sources ==
- Marryat, Horace (1862). One Year in Sweden. London: J. Murray.
