= Gökhem Church =

Coordinates: 58°10′25″N 13°24′27″E

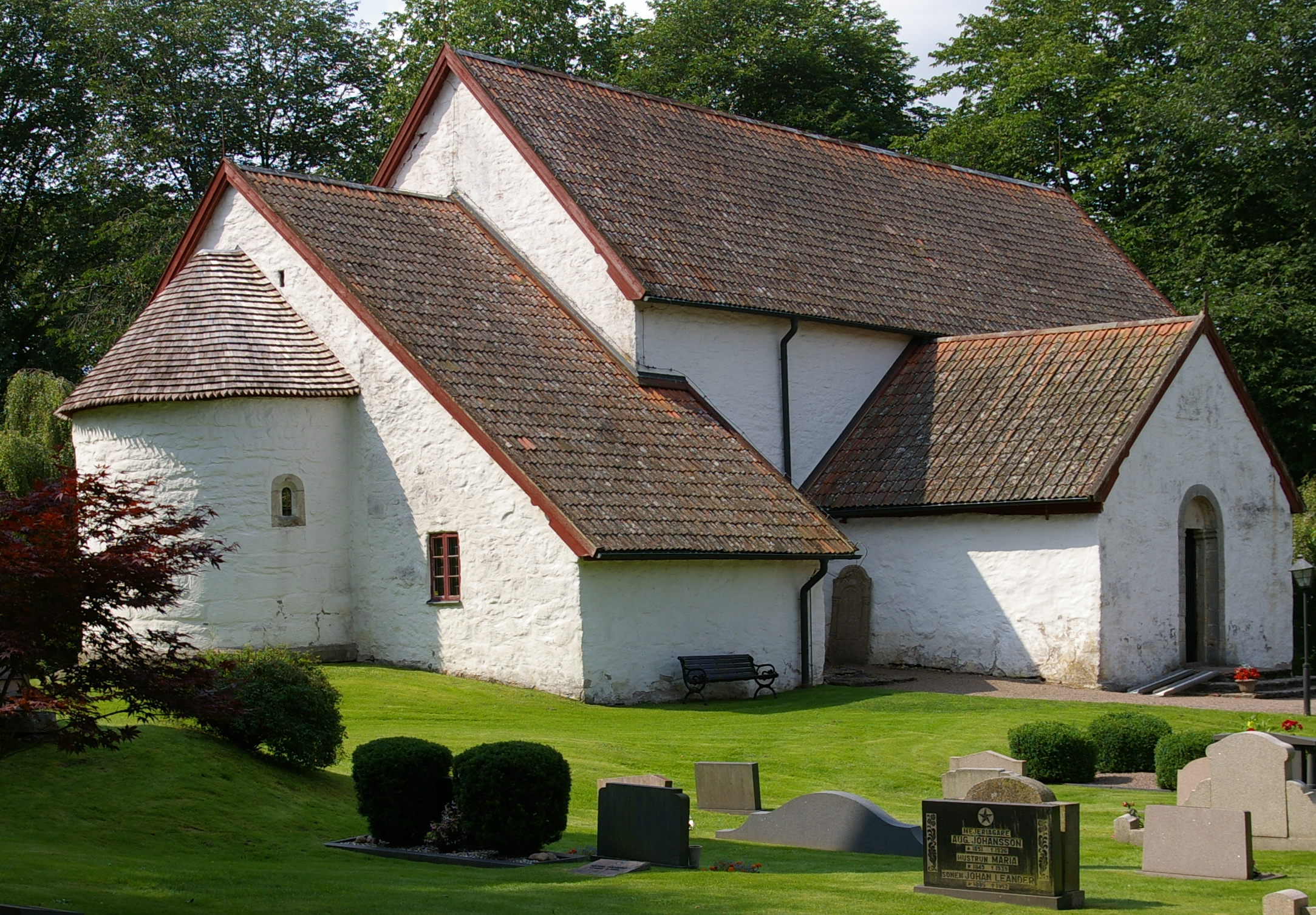
Gökhem Church

Gökhem Church (Swedish: Gökhems kyrka) is a medieval Lutheran church built in the Romanesque style. Located some 12 km (7.5 mi) west of Falköping in Västra Götaland County, Sweden, it belongs to the Diocese of Skara. One of Sweden's oldest stone churches, it is noted for its well-preserved 15th-century frescos, possibly the work of Master Amund.

== History and architecture ==
Gökhem Church is one of Sweden's oldest churches. Tree-ring dating of the church's beams indicates it was built around 1077. Built of sandstone and limestone, it originally consisted of a rounded apse, a chancel and a wider nave. A chapel and a sacristy were later added to the north of the chancel. While many of the windows have been enlarged, the one on the north side of the chancel has remained unaltered since the Middle Ages. The bell tower is said to have been built by Russian prisoners in the 1720s.

== Interior ==
The vaults, replacing an earlier flat wooden ceiling, were built c. 1485. Until about 1720, there was a rood screen and a medieval altar. The image of Mary was then moved into the chapel. The 18th-century pulpit is decorated with paintings of the prophets and disciples while the organ loft has modern paintings of the apostles. The sculpted figures below the pulpit are from the 17th century. The church has two 12th-century fonts, one from the nearby Överkyrke Church which is now a ruin.

== Frescos ==
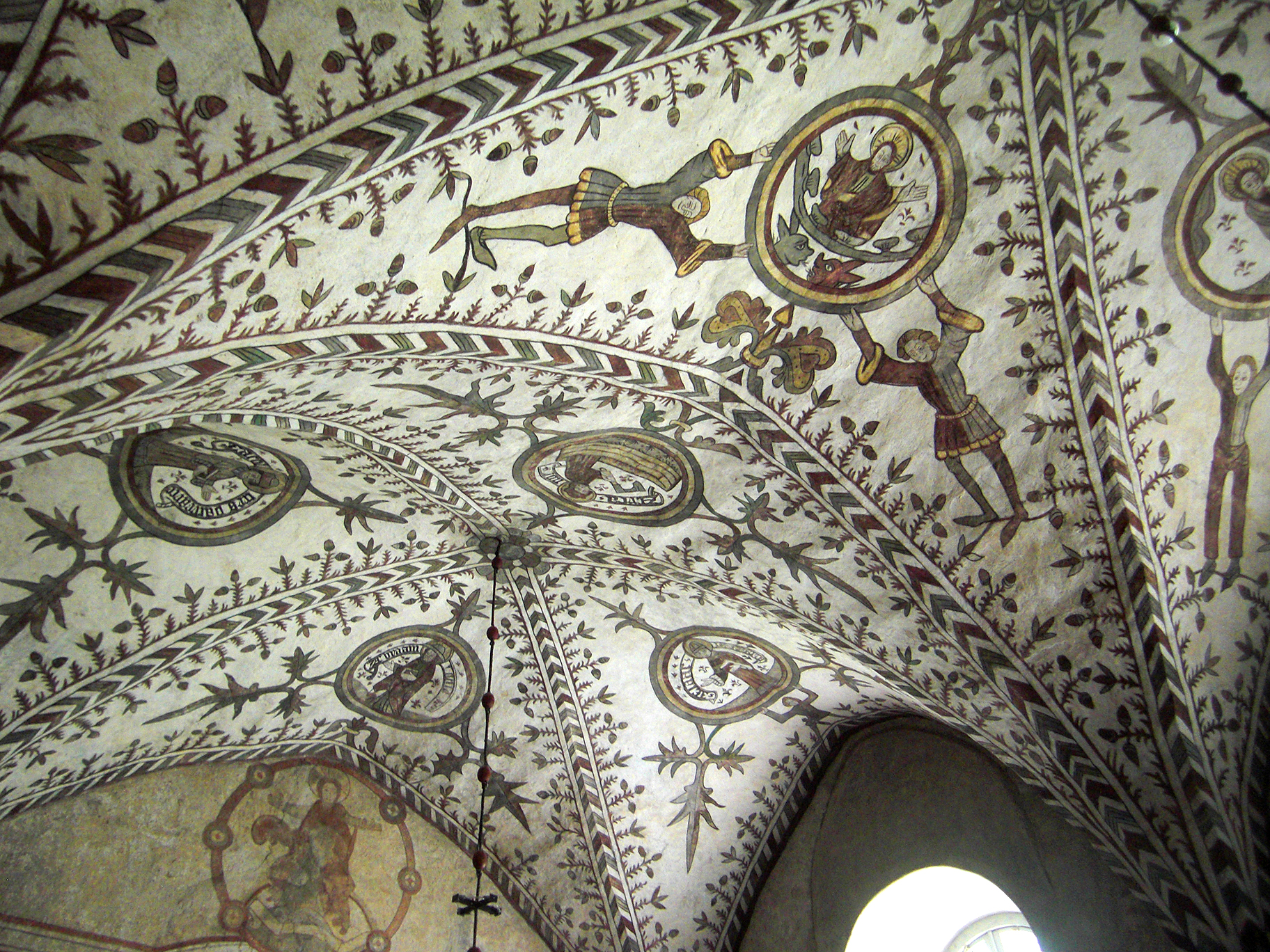
Nave frescos unspoiled by whitewash

The church walls and ceiling are decorated with 15th-century frescos in shades of brown, green and blue-grey. Those in the vaults of the nave have never been covered in whitewash and are therefore unusually well preserved. Those on the walls, which have been restored, are in worse condition. Those in the apse and chancel have suffered from the blue paint with which they were covered in the 19th century.

The resemblance of the frescos with those in Södra Råda Church indicate they may well have been painted by the same artist: Master Amund. The chancel frescos include paintings of the Trinity, the Fathers of the Church and the prophets. The central vault depicts scenes from the Creation, while in the western part of the nave there are images of the deadly sins and the seven virtues. Mary and the rosary can be seen on the north wall. The legend of Catherine of Alexandria decorates the porch.

== Bibliography ==
- Hernfjäll, Viola (1987). Gökhems kyrka (in Swedish). Skara stifts kyrkobeskrivningskomm. ISBN 978-91-86258-05-4.
