= Ekornavallen =

Archaeological site in Falköping, Sweden

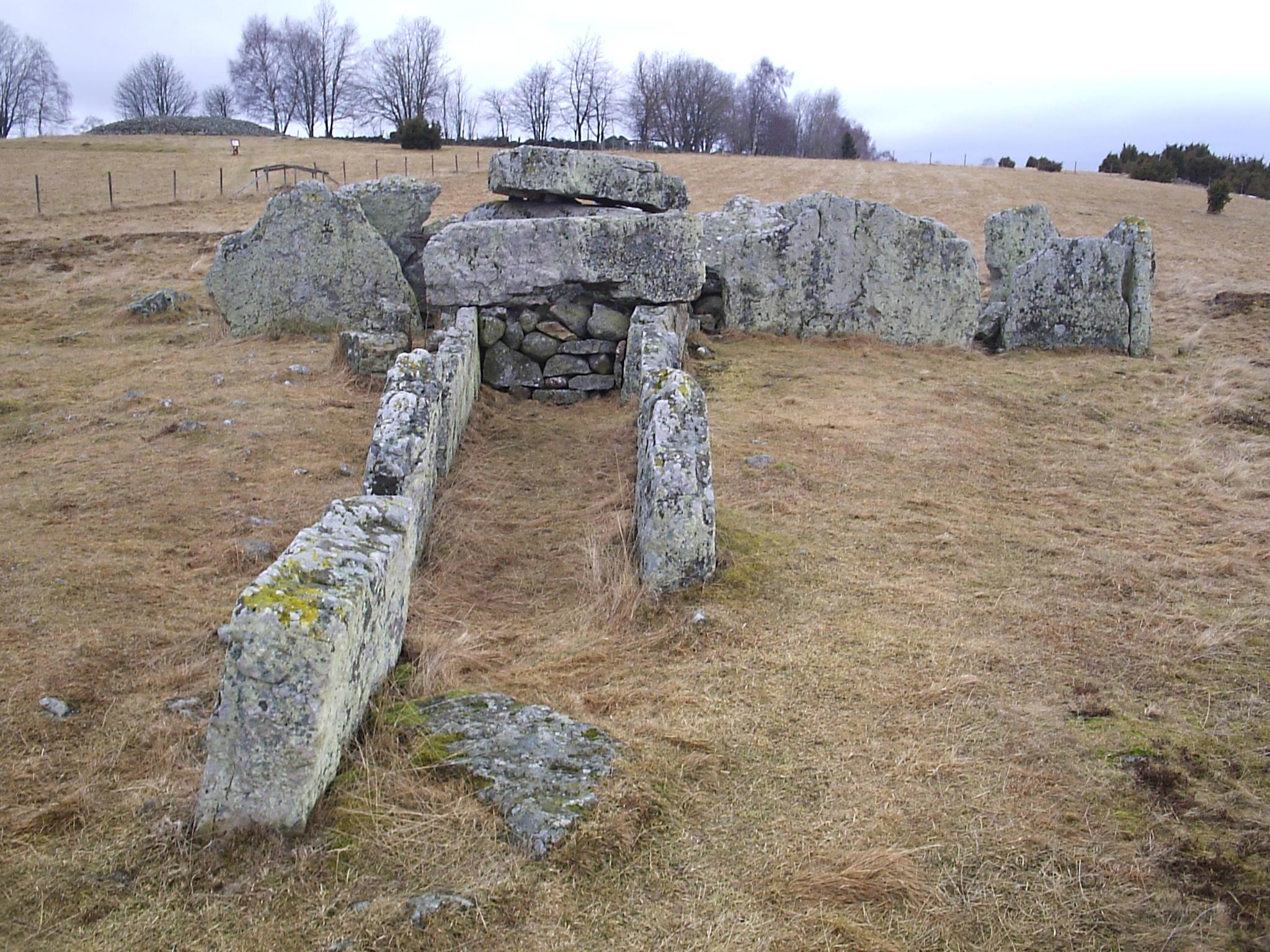
- Girommen passage grave at Ekornavallen

- Location within Sweden
- 58.278889°N 13.604722°E
- Type: Burial ground
- Periods: Neolithic, Bronze Age, Iron Age
- Location: Falköping, Sweden

Ekornavallen is an ancient burial ground in the Falköping Municipality in Sweden. It contains a variety of ancient monuments dating from the Stone, Bronze and Iron Ages.

== Overview ==
The Ekornavallen burial ground is located 15 km (9 miles) north of the city of Falköping. It contains four passage graves and a gallery grave from the Neolithic period, as well as cairns, stone circles, twelve standing stones, eight round stone settings and one triangular stone setting all dating from the Bronze and Iron Ages. It is estimated that the field was used over a six to seven thousand-year period.

== Girommen passage grave ==
The largest, and best known, of the Neolithic passage graves at Ekornavallen is one called the "Girommen" which according to early writers means the giant oven. It consists of sandstone slabs, but the mound which once covered the grave is entirely gone. Between the lower passage and the chamber proper lies a very large and thick slab, the "Key stone", resting on the passage stones. The grave was restored in the 1940s when a fragment of a chisel, some amber slivers and some ornate potsherds were found.

== Other structures ==
Among the other structures at Ekornavallen is a probable stone cist. During its restoration a flint knife was found in the surface layer. The cairns at Ekornavallen probably date to the Bronze Age. The largest cairn has a diameter of more than 20 metres, is 2 metres high, and is surrounded by large kerb stones. The individual standing stones ("bautastones"), mark the Iron Age graves at Ekornavallen, and they are placed in an almost straight line from the north to south. The stone circles are of a type common in Sweden which were typically built in the five hundred years up to 500 AD. Their function is uncertain.
