= Finnestorp =

Archaeological site in Västergötland

Coordinates: 58°10′00″N 13°14′06″E

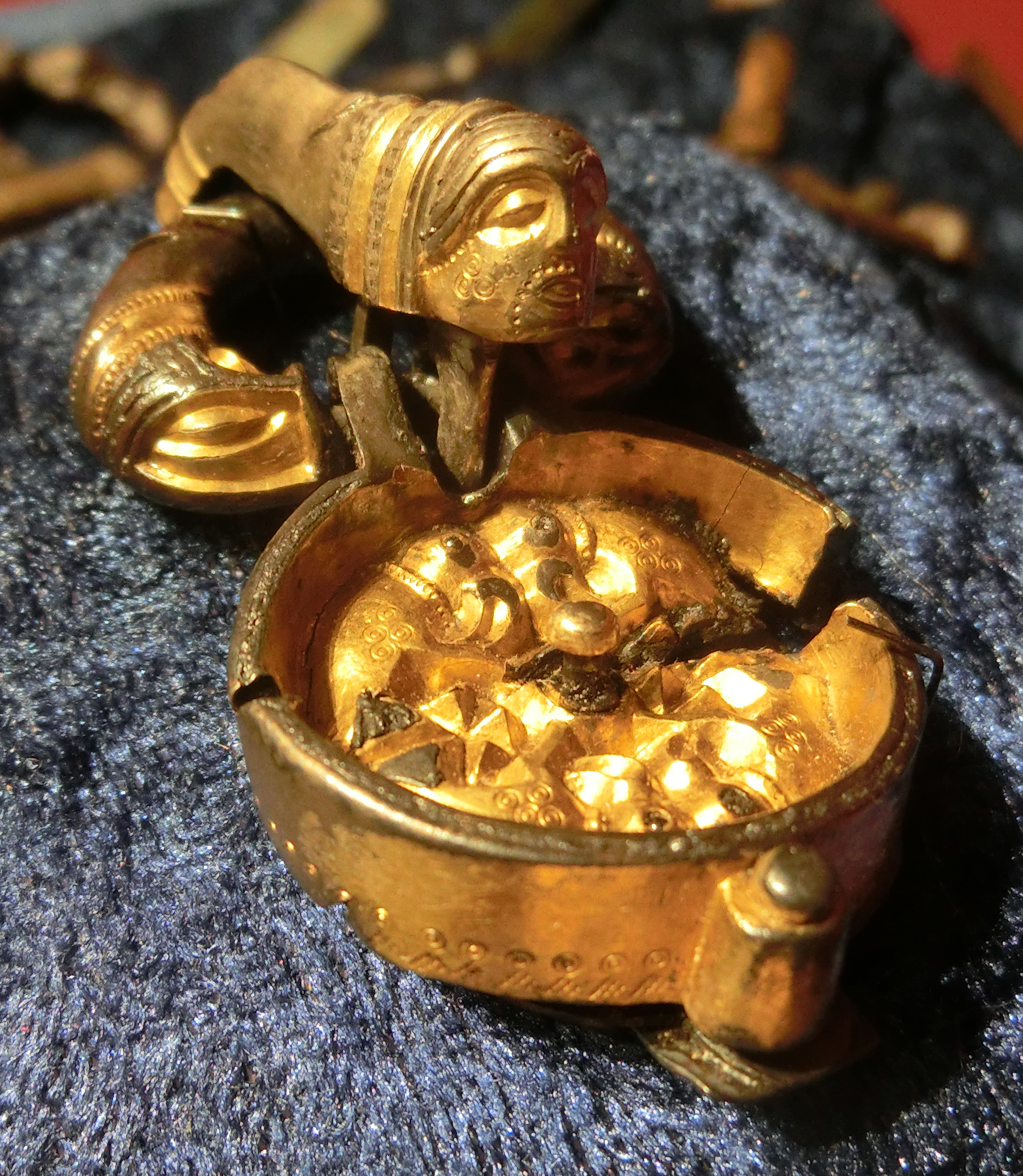
The archaeologist Bengt Nordqvist interprets this belt buckle found at Finnestorp as a depiction of Odin and Mímir's Well.

Finnestorp is an archaeological site in Västergötland, Sweden, where many objects from the Migration Period have been found. The site was discovered in 1902 and excavated in 2000–2004 and 2008–2012. It has been interpreted as a cult site where war booty was sacrificed. The more than 700 finds include weapons, horse gear and horses, mainly from the period 350–550 AD.

== History ==
The first discoveries at Finnestorp, a location in Västergötland, Sweden, were made in 1902 during a road construction through a wetland area. Minor excavations were made in 1904, 1980 and 1992. More extensive excavations took place in 2000–2004 and 2008–2012.

== Description ==
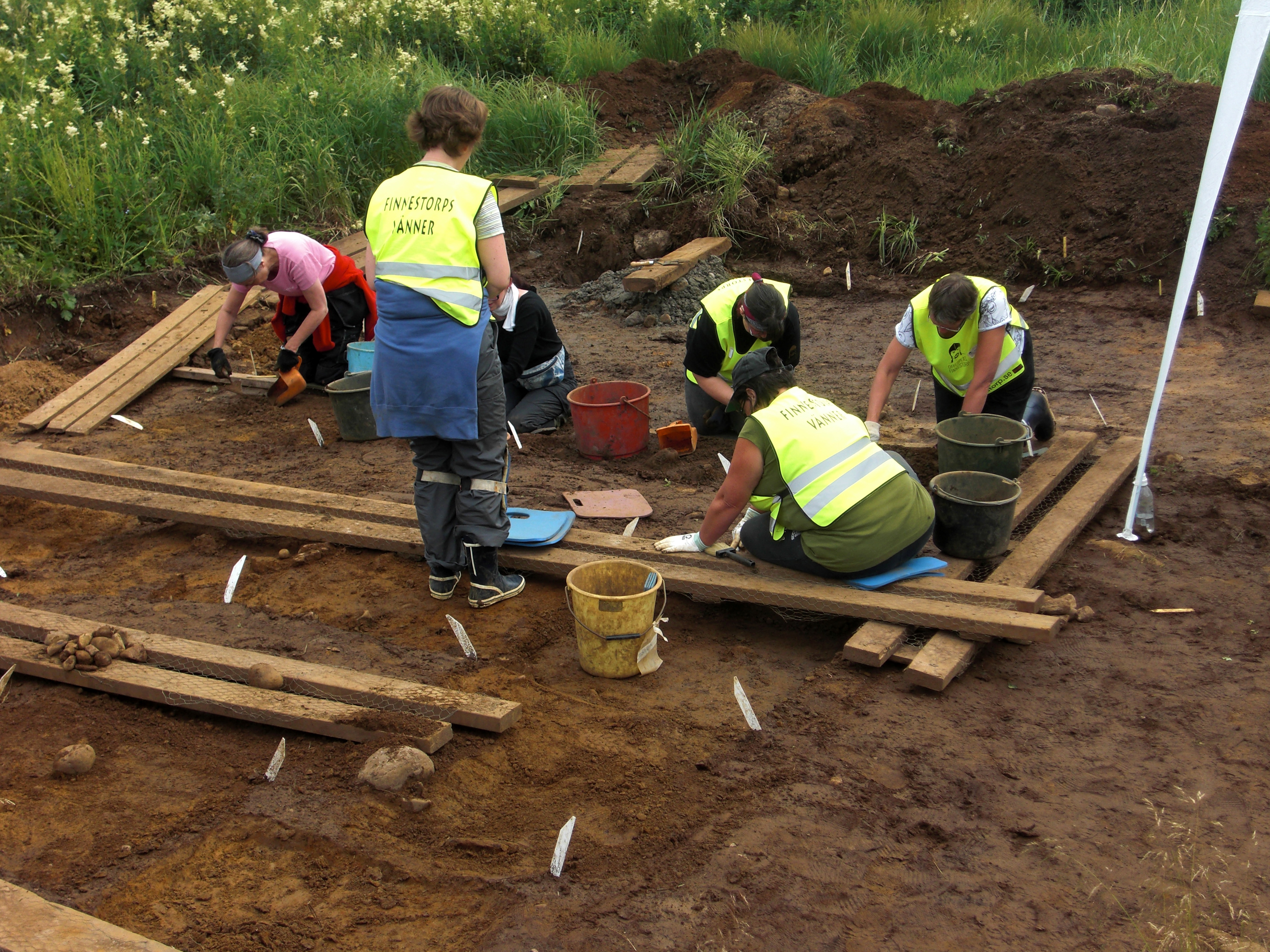
Excavations at the site in 2009

Finnestorp has been interpreted as a cult site where war booty was sacrificed. It has similarities to the site Skedemosse on Öland and to Migration Period war-booty sites in Denmark and northern Germany. As of 2009, more than 700 artefacts had been found throughout an area in Finnestorp that stretches 400 m × 100 m (1,310 ft × 330 ft). The most common finds are weapons—especially swords and spears—horse equipment and horses. Most metal artefacts are individual pieces that have been cut or chopped and thrown in the water. A few finds consist of complete and intact bridles and sword belt sets that have been placed in pits. There are some skeletal remains from boars, sheep, goats and cattle. Skeletal remains from at least two humans have been found and dated to the site's early period. The central parts of the area have traces of wooden platforms which may have been used to access the wetland and fire pits which may have been for meals. The artefacts and carbon-14-dated fire pits are mainly from 350 to 550 AD, although the area was in use from around 100 to 600 AD.

A sixth-century gilded belt buckle found in 2002 received media attention in 2012 when the archaeologist Bengt Nordqvist interpreted it as a depiction of the god Odin. According to Nordqvist, it corresponds to a scene from the Old Norse poem Völuspá, where Odin places his eye in Mímir's well. If the identification is accepted, it confirms that the myth existed in the Migration Period and impacts discussions about Old Norse religion.

== See also ==
- Horse sacrifice
- Migration Period art
- Wetland deposits in Scandinavia
- Wetlands and islands in Germanic paganism
