= Ålleberg =

Table mountain in Sweden

Coordinates: 58°08′N 13°36′E

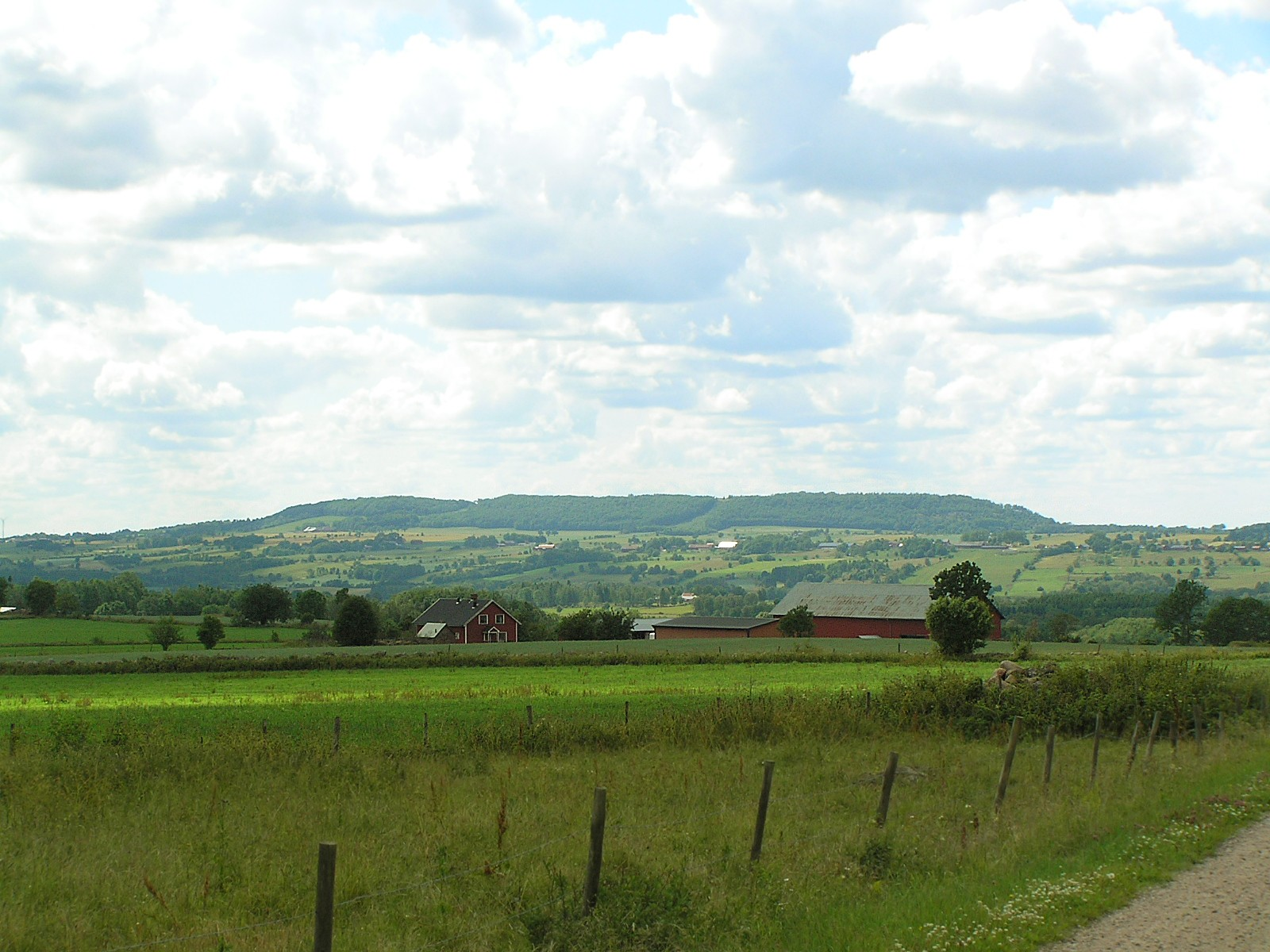
Ålleberg in July, from the north-east.

Ålleberg (Swedish pronunciation: [ɔlɛˈbærj]) is a 330 m high mountain, or table, southeast of Falköping, Sweden located in Falköping Municipality.

== See also ==
- Knights of Ålleberg
