= Falköping =

Place in Västergötland, Sweden

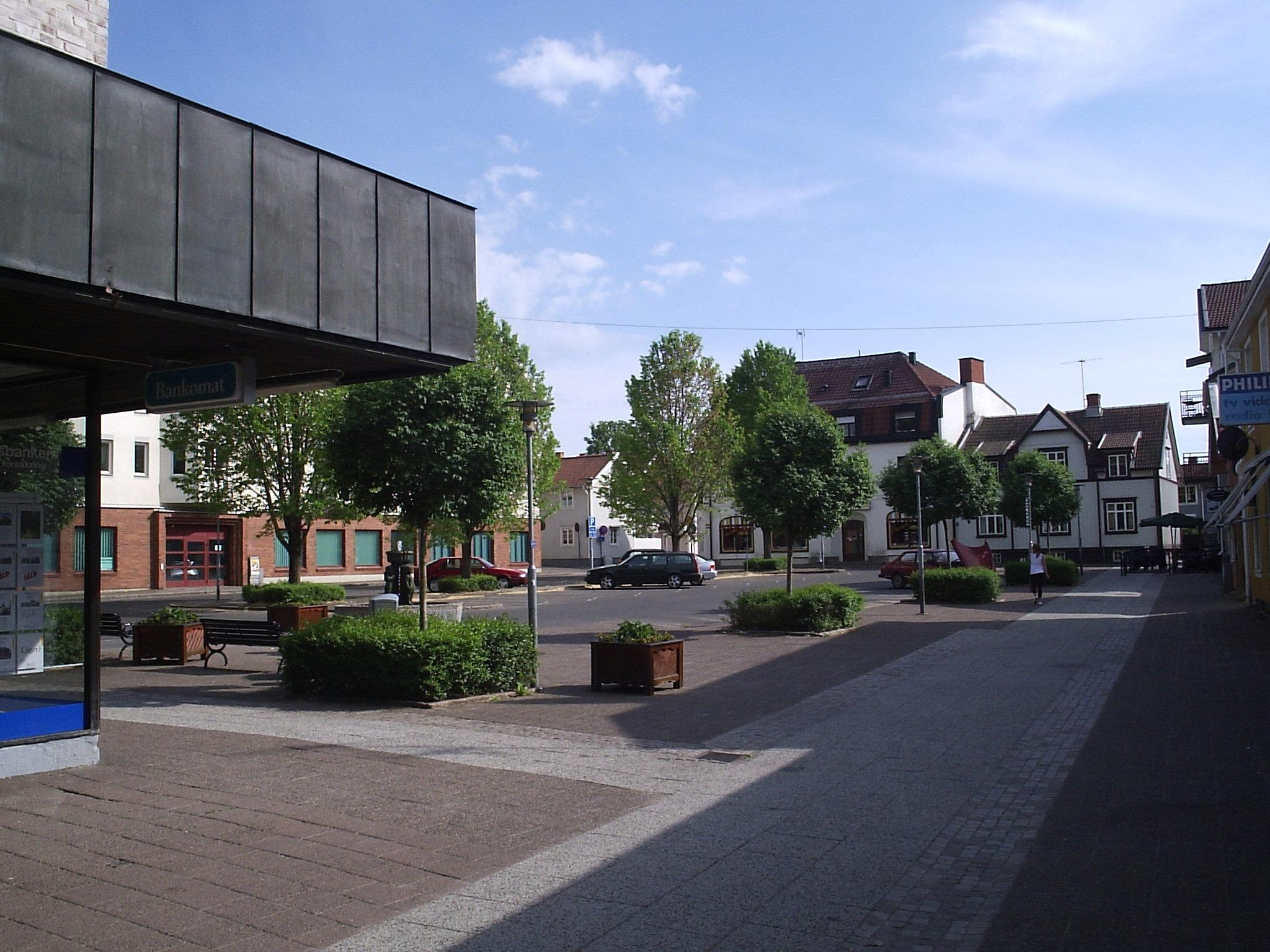
- Trätorget (17 June 2006)

- Coat of arms

- Location within Västra Götaland Location within Sweden
- Coordinates: 58°10′30″N 13°33′11″E
- Country: Sweden
- Province: Västergötland
- County: Västra Götaland County
- Municipality: Falköping Municipality
- Founded: 1200

Area
  - Total: 9.46 km^{2} (3.65 sq mi)
- Elevation: 218 m (715 ft)

Population (31 December 2023)
  - Total: 17,924
  - Density: 1,890/km^{2} (4,910/sq mi)
- Time zone: UTC+1 (CET)
  - Summer (DST): UTC+2 (CEST)
- Postal code: 521 xx
- Area code: (+46) 515
- Climate: Dfb
- Website: Official website

Falköping (Swedish pronunciation: [ˈfâlːˌɕøːpɪŋ]) is a locality and the seat of Falköping Municipality in Västra Götaland County, Sweden. It had 17,924 inhabitants in 2023.

== History ==
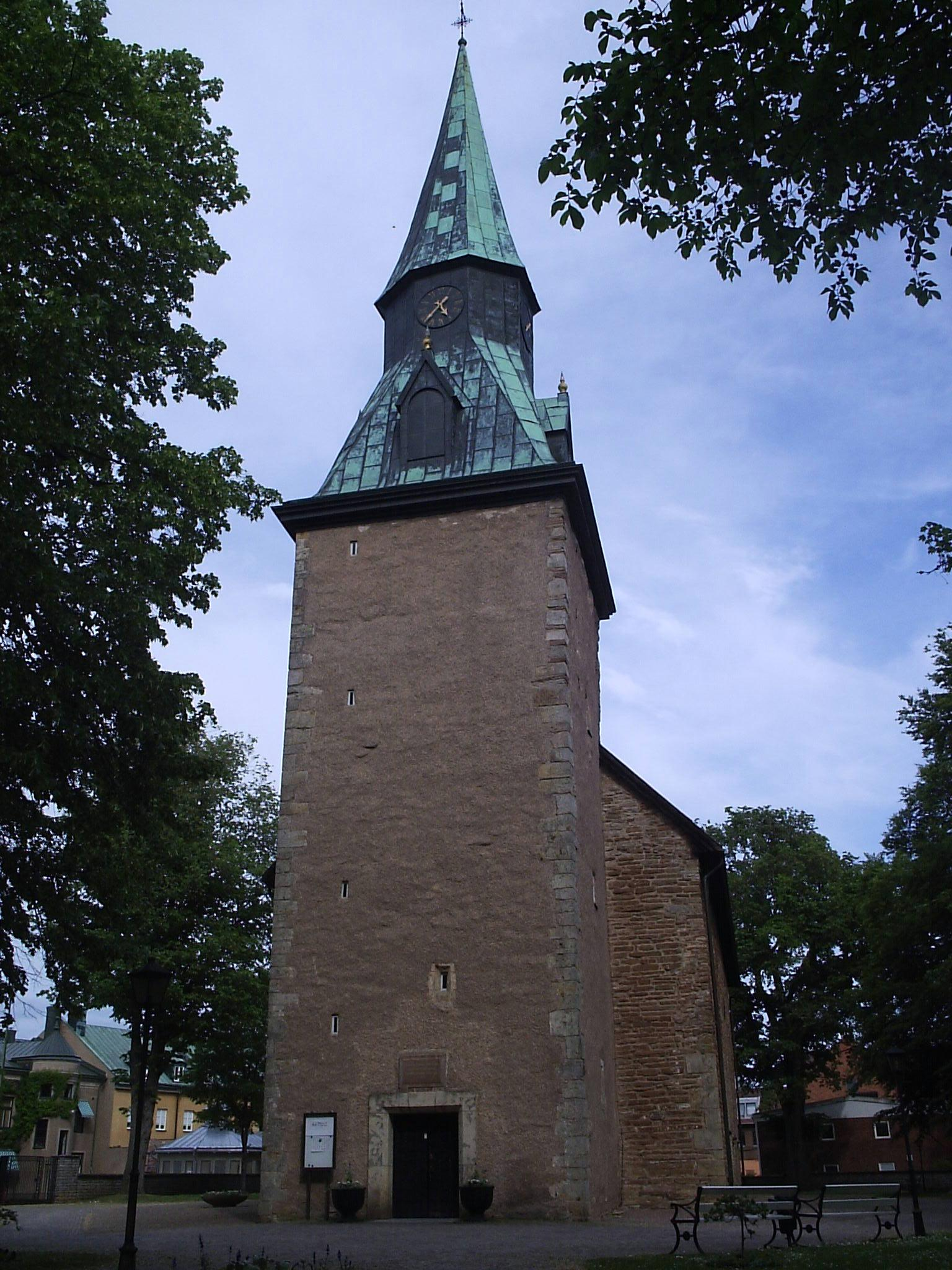
Sankt Olofs kyrka, Falköping

The town of Falköping was first spoken of in the Icelandic Rimbegla (around 1100 A.D.), and is mentioned in the Westrogothic law. It was also an important site of pilgrimage due to its 12th-century church dedicated to Saint Olaf (Sankt Olofs kyrka). The town was heading for a shut-down during the 16th century and was even burnt to the ground by the Danish during the Northern Seven Years' War. However the town survived and was rebuilt.

Falköping or Falbygden (when meaning the agricultural landscape in which Falköping is located) is widely known for its ancient remains of Stone Age, Bronze Age and Iron Age. The town is located between the two plateaus Mösseberg and Ålleberg. The location has been inhabited since the end of the ice age and cultivated by people for the last 6000 years. The oldest find is a form of megalithic tomb called dolmen, dating back to 3400 B.C. There are also 28 passage graves dating back to 3300 B.C.

Also several cists have been found here, they can be traced back to earlier Stone Age (Senneolitikum) 2400–1500 B.C and are believed to be built or inspired by travelers from the countries where this kind of grave was commonly constructed. Falköping is the only town in Europe with this amount of megalithic graves as visible contribution to the town image.

== Local industry ==
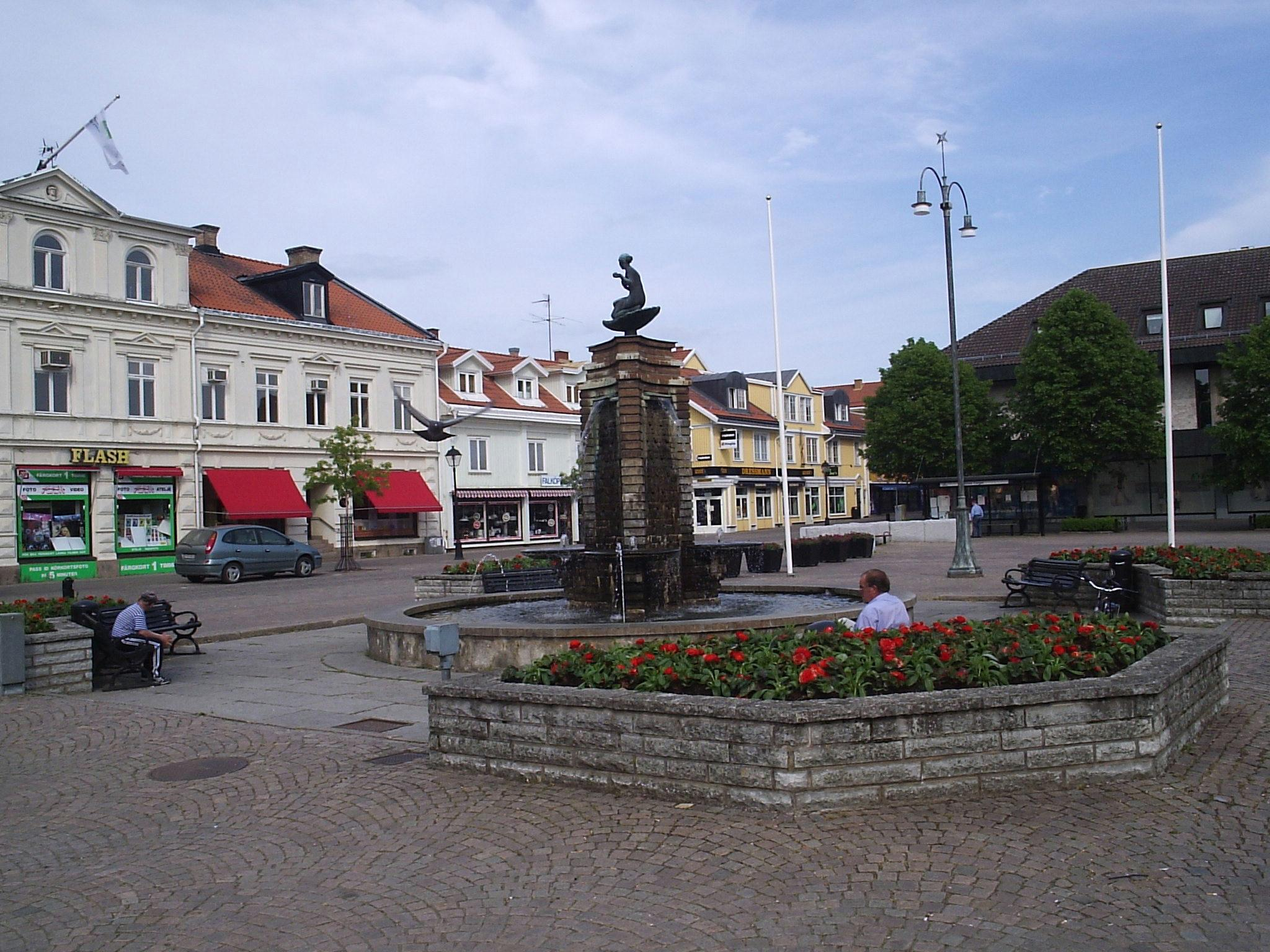
'Stora Torget' – the main town square

Early industry in Falköping was the Victoria Brewery (sv. Victoriabryggeriet) (1856–1953), Haglunds Roller blinds factory (sv. Haglunds rullgardinsfabrik) (1885-) and Forss hat factory (sv. Forss hattfabrik) (1880–). In the early 20th-century (1900–) several companies were established, such as: Alton gold forgery (1928), Falköping dairy factory (sv. Falköpings Mejeri) (1930–), workshop industry Arkivator (sv. verkstadsindustrin Arkivator) (1940–) and the sewing factories Svaréns and Ottossons.

Falköpings Mejeri (Falköping dairy factory) is a co-operative dairy company which supplies milk to grocery stores in western Sweden. The Falbygdens Ost cheese factory supplies cheese to stores throughout Sweden. A "dry port" (sv. torrhamn) has recently been built in connection to the railway, enabling companies in the surrounding area to handle cargo in a more efficient way.

== Geography ==
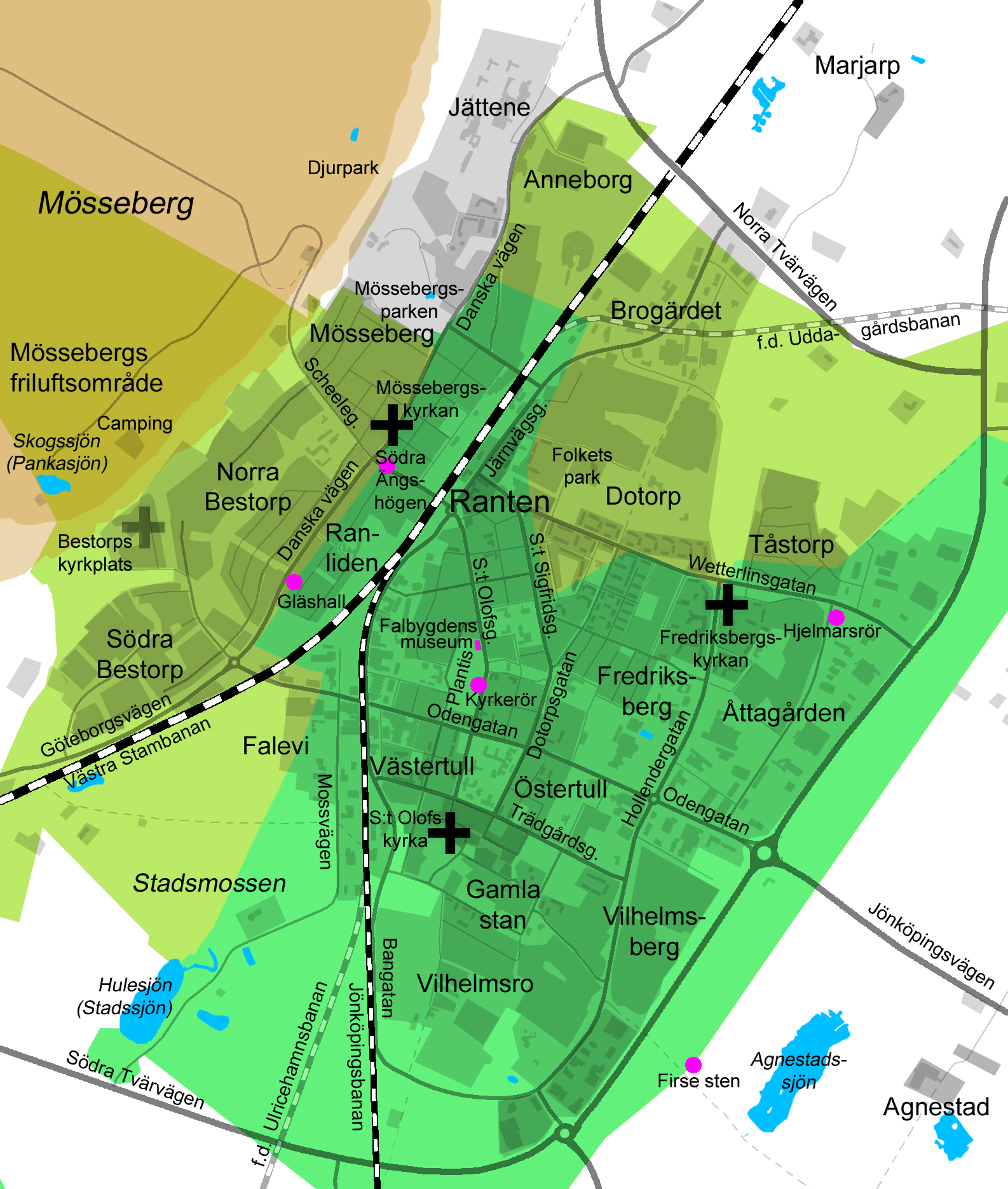
Map of Falköping

The town is located where the Western Main Line (Swedish: Västra stambanan) between Stockholm and Gothenburg meets the railline from Nässjö via Jönköping to Falköping. As it takes less than a one-hour train journey to reach both Gothenburg and Jönköping respectively, Falköping makes a good location for commuting.

== Notable people ==
- Madelen Janogy (born 1995), footballer
- Jan Karlsson (born 1966), Olympic cyclist

== Sports and leisure ==
Association football

Falköping has several football fields.

Clubs include:

- Falköpings KIK
- IFK Falköping
- Falköpings FK

Motor Sports

The Falköpings Motorklubb hosts car and motorbike racing at the Motorstadion, about 5 km west of the locality. The Club originally ran a motorcycle speedway team known as Falkarna, who raced in the Swedish Speedway Team Championship. The speedway track held the Continental Speedway final round of the 1952 Individual Speedway World Championship.

Walking routes

There is also an 8 km (5.0 mi) long pathway around the core of the town called Hälsoslingan (path of health). It is used for running and taking walks together with friends and family.

== The folk tale of The Riders of Ålleberg ==
According to local folklore, whenever the town of Falköping is in danger, the mountain-side of Ålleberg shall fall and reveal a troop of knight-like figures who shall ride out and vanquish the threat. They are known as Ållebergs Ryttare (The Riders of Ålleberg).

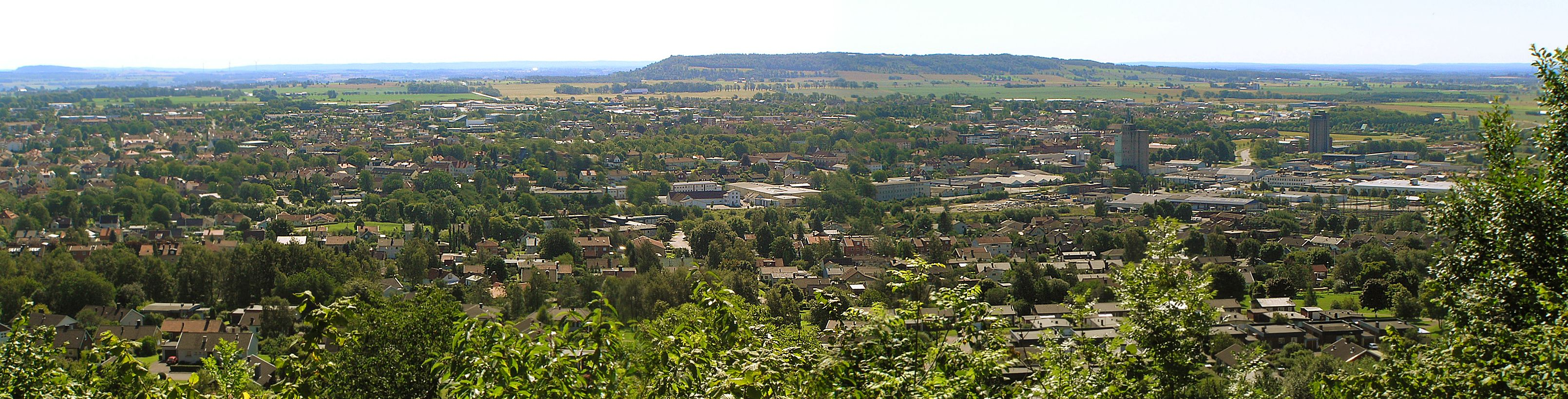
Falköping from Mösseberg, with Ålleberg in the background
