= Listed buildings in Västra Götaland County =

There are 241 listed buildings (Swedish: byggnadsminne) in Västra Götaland County.

== Ale Municipality ==
Image	Name	Premises	Number of buildings	Year built	Architect	Coordinates	ID
	Repslagarmuseet	Starrkärr 15:4; Carlmarks repslageri Gamla repslagarbanan i Älvängen	1			57.96197°N 12.12346°E	21300000013708

== Alingsås Municipality ==
Image	Name	Premises	Number of buildings	Year built	Architect	Coordinates	ID
	Alingsås rådhus	Kristina 7 previously Kristina 3	1	1769		57.93030°N 12.53230°E	21300000013053
	Alströmerska magasinet	Lejonet 1	1	1731		57.92856°N 12.53266°E	21300000013068
	Brunos garvaregård	Korpen 2	2	18th century		57.93123°N 12.53466°E	21300000013052
	Hedénska gården	Kronan 1, 14	2	19th century		57.93001°N 12.53366°E	21300000013055
	Hüttlingska gården	Cederberg 1	1	19th century		57.92886°N 12.53115°E	21300000012977
	Karlborgska gården	Hästskon 1	4	19th century		57.93106°N 12.53763°E	21300000013051
	Lenanderska gården	Gustaf 3 previously Gustaf 2	1	19th century		57.93051°N 12.53343°E	21300000013050
	Nygrenska gården	Pärlan 4, 9	4	1760–1770s		57.93053°N 12.53613°E	21300000013075
	Sandquistska gården	Hill 3	5	circa 1830		57.92868°N 12.53044°E	21300000012961
	Del av Anten-Gräfsnäs järnväg	Humlebo 1:15; Arlid 1:14; Kvarnabo 4:1; Kvarnabo 4:2	10	1900		58.04118°N 12.46988°E	21000001655961

== Bengtsfors Municipality ==
Image	Name	Premises	Number of buildings	Year built	Architect	Coordinates	ID
	Alltorps tingshus, häradshäkte	Alltorp 1:9	4	sent 1700–tal		58.85364°N 12.17115°E	21300000013576

== Bollebygd Municipality ==
Image	Name	Premises	Number of buildings	Year built	Architect	Coordinates	ID
	Hultafors järnvägsstation	Fjälla 1:123	1	1907–1909		57.69577°N 12.73626°E	21300000012988

== Borås Municipality ==
Image	Name	Premises	Number of buildings	Year built	Architect	Coordinates	ID
	Biografen Röda Kvarn	Triton 2	1	1914	Lars Kellman	57.71971°N 12.93501°E	21300000012983
	Borås centralstation	Järnvägen 1:2	1	1894	Adrian Crispin Peterson	57.72069°N 12.93227°E	21300000012985
	Seglora gamla prästgård	Seglora 1:13 previously Seglora 1:1	4	1793		57.57909°N 12.72640°E	21300000013625

== Dals-Ed Municipality ==
Image	Name	Premises	Number of buildings	Year built	Architect	Coordinates	ID
	Gäserudsstugan	Gäserud 1:17	3			58.93783°N 12.02616°E	21300000013095

== Essunga Municipality ==
Image	Name	Premises	Number of buildings	Year built	Architect	Coordinates	ID
	Annestad västergården	Annestad 2:19, 3:21	8			58.27049°N 12.71198°E	21300000015820

== Falköping Municipality ==
Image	Name	Premises	Number of buildings	Year built	Architect	Coordinates	ID
	Falköpings centralstation	Ranten 1:12; Previously Ranten 1:1	3	1934	Birger Jonson	58.17563°N 13.55260°E	21300000013023
	Mössebergs kuranstalt	Mösseberg 47:10, 48:4, 49:10, 49:21-27, 49:49–50 m fl previously stg 684, 1501, 1504-1506, 1520, 1530-1532, 1534, 1545	32			58.18250°N 13.54597°E	21300000013027
	Ryttarens torvströfabrik	Guddarp 1:27; Yllestad 8:4, 8:15		1905–06		58.020556°N 13.736667°E	21000001019164

== Färgelanda Municipality ==
Image	Name	Premises	Number of buildings	Year built	Architect	Coordinates	ID
	Ödeborgs fornsal	Brattefors 1:10	1			58.54487°N 11.98000°E	21300000021447

== Grästorp Municipality ==
Image	Name	Premises	Number of buildings	Year built	Architect	Coordinates	ID
	Hedåkers säteri	Hedåker 1:14	16			58.29966°N 12.72799°E	21300000013627

== Gullspång Municipality ==
Image	Name	Premises	Number of buildings	Year built	Architect	Coordinates	ID
	Hova prästgård	Hova Prästbol 3:2	4			58.85921°N 14.21518°E	21300000013751

== Göteborg Municipality ==
Image	Name	Premises	Number of buildings	Year built	Architect	Coordinates	ID
	Kvarteret Frimuraren 1	Inom Vallgraven 15:1	4			57.70578°N 11.96598°E	21300000007999
	Avenyn 16-22	Lorensberg 53:1, 53:3-4, 53:6	4			57.70039°N 11.97574°E	21300000008021
	Kvarteret Masthugget 8:12	Masthugget 8:12	4			57.69914°N 11.95156°E	21300000008018
	Göteborgs rådhus	Nordstaden 11:7 Rådhuset 7	1			57.70693°N 11.96565°E	21300000008209
	Nya Varvet	Nya Varvet 726:43 previously 726:7	2			57.68583°N 11.88453°E	21300000019541
	Torpet Klara	Biskopsgården 830:902	5			57.73435°N 11.90331°E	21300000021403
	Kvarteret Alströmer 9	Inom Vallgraven 54:9	1			57.70529°N 11.96199°E	21300000008038
	Aftonstjärnan	Lindholmen 735:345	2			57.70697°N 11.93283°E	21300000008009
	Bergslagsbanans station	Gullbergsvass 703:61 previously Gullbergsvass 703:56	1			57.71248°N 11.97393°E	21300000027694
	Biografen Flamman	Gårda 68:1	1			57.71464°N 12.00165°E	21300000020480
	Bäckebol	Backa 766:594 previously stg 13817	1			57.76031°N 11.98410°E	21300000008183
	Chalmerska huset	Inom Vallgraven 16:14 previously Kommerserådet 14	1			57.70554°N 11.96373°E	21300000008037
	Dicksonska palatset	Heden 16:12 previously Diamanten 1	1			57.70287°N 11.97412°E	21300000008189
	Domkyrkobrunnen	Inom Vallgraven 65:1 previously Domkyrkan 1	1			57.70436°N 11.96397°E	21300000008191
	Engelska kyrkan	Inom Vallgraven 30:2 previously Engelska kyrkan 2	1			57.70209°N 11.96179°E	21300000008196
	Frimurarlogen	Inom Vallgraven 15:4 previously Frimuraren 4	1			57.70595°N 11.96709°E	21300000008197
	Gamla fattighuset	Stampen 11:14 previously Stångebro	2			57.70793°N 11.98695°E	21300000008198
	Gathenhielmska huset	Majorna 722:105 previously Majorna 301:1	1			57.69857°N 11.93412°E	21300000008202
	Gegerfeltska villan	Inom Vallgraven 30:3 previously Engelska kyrkan 3	1			57.70183°N 11.96200°E	21300000007972
	Kallebäcks källa	Kallebäck 752:23 previously stg 12957	1			57.68205°N 12.01901°E	21300000008204
	Televerkets hus	Inom Vallgraven 36:4 previously Telegrafen 2	1			57.70298°N 11.96077°E	21300000008227
	Länsresidenset	Inom vallgraven 53:16 previously Residenset K:1	1			57.70573°N 11.95991°E	21300000008376
	Börshuset	Nordstaden 16:2 previously Högvakten 4	1			57.70760°N 11.96627°E	21300000008184
	Centralposthuset	Stampen 1:1	1			57.70808°N 11.97502°E	21300000007990
	Göteborgs centralstation	Gullbergsvass 17:3 previously 703:6	1			57.70871°N 11.97322°E	21300000008287
	Göteborgs kanotförening	Älvsborg 855:405	2			57.66082°N 11.84732°E	21300000019858
	Göteborgs remfabrik	Gårda 23:14 previously Bleket 5, 7, 8	3			57.70292°N 11.99176°E	21300000008207
	Göteborgs stadshus	Nordstaden 16:2 .d. Högvakten 3	1			57.70760°N 11.96627°E	21300000008223
	Göteborgs synagoga	Inom Vallgraven 3:7	1			57.70562°N 11.97226°E	21300000007987
	Göteborgs universitet	Lorensberg 60:1 previously 706:12-13	1			57.69857°N 11.97148°E	21300000008385
	Göteborgs fd spinnhus	Stampen 20:2	2			57.71316°N 11.99221°E	21000001671781
	Hagabadet	Haga 3:1	1			57.69946°N 11.95624°E	21300000008011
	Härlanda fängelse	Kålltorp 4:16-17 previously 4:15	10			57.71694°N 12.01616°E	21300000008041
	Hästskosömsfabriken	Gårda 23:12-13 previously 23:10; Bleket 10	2			57.70334°N 11.99162°E	21300000008252
	Kronhuset	Nordstaden 19:1, 19:3, 38:1, 703:32	6			57.70778°N 11.96291°E	21300000008210
	Kvareret Alströmer 7	Inom Vallgraven 54:10	1			57.70525°N 11.96175°E	21300000008035
	Kvarteret Fanjunkaren	Haga 8:3	2			57.69919°N 11.95391°E	21300000007993
	Kvarteret Furan	Vasastaden 12:8	1			57.69671°N 11.96563°E	21300000007985
	Kvarteret Fänriken i Haga	Haga 7:1	5			57.69902°N 11.95486°E	21300000015256
	Gamla tullen, Göteborg	Nordstaden 13:7	1			57.70658°N 11.96136°E	21300000008006
	Kvarteret Granen	Vasastaden 15:17	2			57.69692°N 11.96733°E	21300000007989
	Kvarteret Grenadieren	Haga 20:20	6			57.69630°N 11.95801°E	21300000008002
	Kvarteret Korpralen	Haga 13:15	6			57.69838°N 11.95548°E	21300000008020
	Kvarteret Landsknekten	Haga 25:18	3			57.69829°N 11.95778°E	21300000008003
	Kvarteret Löjtnanten	Haga 6:1	1			57.69889°N 11.95595°E	21300000027241
	Kvarteret Majoren	Haga 4:2	1			57.69920°N 11.95708°E	21300000027240
	Kvarteret Päronet	Annedal 2:5	1			57.69470°N 11.96205°E	21300000007986
	Kvarteret Rydboholm	Lorensberg 40:1, 40:2	2			57.70044°N 11.96949°E	21300000007974
	Kvarteret Sidenvävaren	Inom Vallgraven 35:16, 35:17	4			57.70337°N 11.96232°E	21300000007975
	Kvarteret Skogen	Stigberget 33:2	4			57.69634°N 11.93818°E	21300000008015
	Kvarteret Vaktposten	Kommendantsängen 3:8	1			57.69420°N 11.95423°E	21300000016998
	Kvibergs kaserner	Kviberg 741:27 previously stg 8661D	15			57.73634°N 12.03157°E	21300000008010
	Landsstatshuset i Göteborg	Inom Vallgraven 53:1	1			57.70573°N 11.95991°E	21300000008371
	Lorensbergs villastad	Lorensberg 11:2, 4, 13:1-2	4			57.69583°N 11.98087°E	21300000008400
	Lärjeholms gård	Hjällbo 55:1 previously 60:1	2			57.76162°N 12.00681°E	21300000008215
	Nya elementarläroverket i Göteborg	Vasastaden 14:1	1			57.69633°N 11.96748°E	21300000008007
	Nya Varvet	Nya Varvet 726:9 fd 726:7; Stg 12319, 12320	1			57.68307°N 11.89070°E	21300000008005
	Nya Älvsborg	Älvsborg 855:752 previously stg 7518	6			57.68549°N 11.83828°E	21300000008358
	Olssonska gården	Majorna 720:216 previously 720:214-216	1			57.69543°N 11.92384°E	21300000008219
	Ostindiska huset	Nordstaden 12:1 previously Ostindska kompaniet 1	1			57.70656°N 11.96332°E	21300000008206
	Sahlgrenska huset	Nordstaden 11:1 Rådhuset 1	1			57.70669°N 11.96416°E	21300000008221
	Sjömannasällskapets hus	Olivedal 32:7 previously Lustgården 7	2			57.69510°N 11.94330°E	21300000008019
	Ahlbergska huset	Inom Vallgraven 64:29 previously Bergväggen 5	1			57.70523°N 11.95949°E	21300000008222
	Skansen Kronan	Haga 715:2 previously stg 8347, 8356	1			57.69605°N 11.95539°E	21300000008351
	Skansen Lejonet	Gullbergsvass 703:4 previously stg 8543, 12351	1			57.71430°N 11.98944°E	21300000008356
	Skändla sörgård	Tuve 3:19; Del av Tuve 42:4	4			57.77729°N 11.93257°E	21300000010806
	Stora Katrinelund	Heden 38:1 previously 705:8 stg 8517	4			57.70387°N 11.98807°E	21300000008224
	Stora Känsö	Känsö 1:1	10			57.62888°N 11.75453°E	21300000008387
	Saluhallen, Göteborg	Inom Vallgraven 72:1	1			57.70355°N 11.96791°E	21300000008225
	Stora Teatern, Göteborg	Lorensberg 38:3 previously Stora Teatern 2	1			57.70255°N 11.97067°E	21300000008226
	Tomtehuset	Vasastaden 12:17 previously Furan 17	1			57.69773°N 11.96539°E	21300000008039
	Trädgårdsföreningen, Göteborg	Heden 705:11 previously stg 8520	10			57.70626°N 11.97556°E	21300000008008
	Villa Dalfrid	Skintebo 432:1 previously Skintebo Stora 2:25	1			57.59249°N 11.92819°E	21300000008229
	Villa Soltorpet	Bö 10:13 previously Draken 13	3			57.70270°N 12.00817°E	21300000008040
	Vinga fyr	Vinga 1:1	2			57.63199°N 11.60123°E	21300000015829
	Wennergrenska huset	Nordstaden 16:2	1			57.70760°N 11.96627°E	21300000008217
	Wernerska villan	Lorensberg 42:1 previously Fågelvik 42	1			57.70127°N 11.97153°E	21300000008228
	Haga bibliotek	Haga 4:1	1			57.69952°N 11.95720°E	21000001789681
	Taubehuset	Majorna 222:2	1			57.69504°N 11.91738°E	21000001678061

== Götene Municipality ==
Image	Name	Premises	Number of buildings	Year built	Architect	Coordinates	ID
	Hönsäters herrgård	Hönsäter 7:25 previously Hönsäter 7:1	6			58.62551°N 13.42581°E	21300000013603
	Jaquette du Rietz' stiftelse	Brunnsborg 7:2 previously Mariedal 1:4	2			58.47746°N 13.44773°E	21300000013314
	Kållängens gamla tingshus	Kollängen 1:9	1			58.50740°N 13.36580°E	21300000013089
	Lilla Bjurum	Bjurum 8:5 previously Bjurum lilla 1:1, 2:2	2			58.49347°N 13.58747°E	21300000013508
	Råbäcks mekaniska stenhuggeri	Råbäck 1:3	1			58.60633°N 13.34713°E	21300000013279

== Herrljunga Municipality ==
Image	Name	Premises	Number of buildings	Year built	Architect	Coordinates	ID
	Gäsene gamla tingshus	Ljung 16:3	1			57.98588°N 13.05487°E	21300000013639

== Hjo Municipality ==
There are no listed buildings in Hjo Municipality.

== Härryda Municipality ==
Image	Name	Premises	Number of buildings	Year built	Architect	Coordinates	ID
	Råda säteri	Råda 1:6	5			57.66024°N 12.09012°E	21300000013319

== Karlsborg Municipality ==
Image	Name	Premises	Number of buildings	Year built	Architect	Coordinates	ID
	Edets benstamp	Sätra 5:1, 5:18	6			58.71703°N 14.35864°E	21300000013478
	Forsviks bruk	Forsvik 5:25, 5:85, 5:109, 5:143, 5:209	21			58.57923°N 14.43570°E	21300000018538
	Karlsborgs fästning	Vanäs 1:9 previously 1:4	108			58.53179°N 14.52795°E	21300000015785
	Kungsvillan	Vanäs 1:5	5			58.53873°N 14.53463°E	21300000013109
	Vanäs fyr	Vanäs 1:9 previously 1:4	1			58.53823°N 14.54000°E	21300000013106

== Kungälv Municipality ==
Image	Name	Premises	Number of buildings	Year built	Architect	Coordinates	ID
	Bohus fästning	Gamla staden 1:11 previously stg 168, 169	1			57.86146°N 11.99971°E	21300000013608
	Burås kvarn	Glöskär 1:8	1			57.82246°N 11.75340°E	21300000013746
	Karlstens fästning	Marstrand 5:6 previously stg 3	5			57.88640°N 11.57833°E	21300000015803
	Kastellegården	Kastellegården 1:1	12			57.84935°N 11.93867°E	21300000013511
	Lundholmska huset	Prästgården 13	1			57.86665°N 11.99051°E	21300000013134
	Marstrands rådhus	Marstrand 25:18	1			57.88734°N 11.58195°E	21300000013273
	Marstrands societetshus	Marstrand 13:1 previously Havet 1	1			57.88827°N 11.57985°E	21300000013645
	Kungälvs rådhus	Rådhuset 11	1			57.86478°N 11.99448°E	21300000013143
	Schwartzska huset	Prästgården 11	2			57.86647°N 11.98976°E	21300000013125
	Strandska huset	Skarpe Nord 6, 7	1			57.86574°N 11.99433°E	21300000013172
	Södra strandverket, Marstand	Marstrand 5:7	1			57.88308°N 11.58532°E	21300000018550
	Thorildska huset	Skarpe Nord 6	1			57.86577°N 11.99390°E	21300000013169
	Tofta herrgård	Lycke-Tofta 1:7 previously Tofta 1:1	10			57.86527°N 11.70862°E	21300000013177
	Ture Bonanders hus	Marstrand 55:4	1			57.88562°N 11.58269°E	21300000013642
	Uddmanska huset	Rådhuset 3	1			57.86598°N 11.99244°E	21300000013136
	Zetterlöfska huset	Rådhuset 12	2			57.86567°N 11.99313°E	21300000013146
	Ärholmens gasstation	Marstrand 5:8, 5:35, 5:36, 5:37, 5:38	8			57.87378°N 11.56642°E	21300000013267

== Lerum Municipality ==
Image	Name	Premises	Number of buildings	Year built	Architect	Coordinates	ID
	Hillefors grynkvarn	Hunstugan 1:109	3			57.79435°N 12.31995°E	21300000013174
	Nääs slott	Näs 7:1	20			57.81573°N 12.39425°E	21300000013353
	Tollereds övre kraftverk, tub	Tollered 1:82	3			57.81853°N 12.41933°E	21300000013355
	Villa Kastenhof	Lerum 2:236 previously Skattegården 2:11; Lerum Västergården 4:11	3			57.77327°N 12.28678°E	21300000013646

== Lidköping Municipality ==
Image	Name	Premises	Number of buildings	Year built	Architect	Coordinates	ID
	Ekebo gård	Ekebo 2:1	10			58.66655°N 13.18691°E	21300000013309
	Lidköpings rådhus	Nya Staden 1:1	1			58.50402°N 13.15764°E	21300000013647
	Grevehuset	Odin 1	3			58.50339°N 13.15623°E	21300000013654
	Prosten Silvius stiftelse	Tun 19:1, 24:1	3			58.43090°N 12.73731°E	21300000013452
	Schougska handelsgården	Ottar 1-2	5			58.50322°N 13.15675°E	21300000013657
	Stola herrgård	Stola 1:8	1			58.59469°N 13.08420°E	21300000013659
	Villa Giacomina	Villa Giacomina 1:15, 1:21 previously 1:1, 1:13	12			58.53496°N 13.13000°E	21300000013039

== Lysekil Municipality ==
Image	Name	Premises	Number of buildings	Year built	Architect	Coordinates	ID
	Curmanska villorna	Kyrkvik 3:1 previously Badhuset 1 Stg 671, 1631, 1632	2			58.27013°N 11.43581°E	21300000013181
	Härnäsets Folkets hus	Svee 1:10	1			58.37423°N 11.40171°E	21300000013085
	Carl Wilhelmsons villa	Fiskebäck 1:124, 1:169, 1:249	1			58.24772°N 11.45627°E	21300000013712

== Mariestad Municipality ==
placeholder

== Mark Municipality ==
Image	Name	Premises	Number of buildings	Year built	Architect	Coordinates	ID
	Förläggargården Assberg	Assberg 4:14 previously Olsagården 4:14	1			57.49623°N 12.66132°E	21300000013383
	Förläggargården Kinna sanden	Kinna 24:130 previously stg 18, 153, 220, 148, 420	1			57.50737°N 12.69675°E	21300000013115
	Förläggargården Källäng (Åsletorp 2:1	previously Jänsagården 2:1	8			57.52356°N 12.72925°E	21300000013597
	Förläggargården Risäng	Brättingstorp 3:99 previously Storegården 3:64	3			57.50676°N 12.71836°E	21300000013581
	Förläggargården Salgutsred	Salgutsred 5:18 previously stadsäga 800 A	3			57.54183°N 12.74912°E	21300000013119
	Förläggargården Haga gård	Gullberg 13:5	2			57.50892°N 12.71849°E	21300000013586
	Rydals industri	Rydal 1:15	6			57.55480°N 12.69378°E	21300000013118
	Förläggargården Sjögarås	Sjögarås 1:1	1			57.46347°N 12.73753°E	21300000013589

== Mellerud Municipality ==
Image	Name	Premises	Number of buildings	Year built	Architect	Coordinates	ID
	Ekholmens herrgård	Ekholmen 2:1	4			58.72359°N 12.38426°E	21300000013047
	Svecklingsbyn	Svecklingebyn 1:39 fd.Svecklingebyn 1:29	5			58.66457°N 12.40444°E	21300000013577

== Mölndal Municipality ==
Image	Name	Premises	Number of buildings	Year built	Architect	Coordinates	ID
	Mölndals Kvarnby	Kvarnhjulet 1	1			57.65686°N 12.02939°E	21300000008065
	Gunnebo slott	Gunnebo 1:27 previously stg 2425-2427	1			57.65784°N 12.06299°E	21300000008230
	Krokslätts fabriker	Kängurun 18	6			57.67038°N 12.00868°E	21300000008068

== Orust Municipality ==
There are no listed buildings in Orust Municipality.

== Partille Municipality ==
Image	Name	Premises	Number of buildings	Year built	Architect	Coordinates	ID
	Partille herrgård	Partille 3:152	1			57.73838°N 12.10250°E	21300000008074
	Partille station	Partille 13:5-6 previously Partille 13:5	4			57.74058°N 12.10065°E	21300000008072

== Skara Municipality ==
Image	Name	Premises	Number of buildings	Year built	Architect	Coordinates	ID
	Brunsbo	Brunsbo 1:3	10			58.39348°N 13.49483°E	21300000013672
	Dagsnäs slott	Dagsnäs 1:3	5			58.28439°N 13.49405°E	21300000012989
	Höjentorp	Höjentorp 1:2 previously Höjentorp 1:1-8:1	3			58.41606°N 13.64120°E	21300000012995
	Skara rådhus	Rådhuset 11 previously 12	1			58.38619°N 13.43761°E	21300000013670
	Skara brandmuseum	Gamla staden 2:1	1			58.38442°N 13.44095°E	21300000013669
	Skara domkapitelhus	Venus 11	4			58.38600°N 13.44097°E	21300000013376
	Skara stifts-, landsbiblioteket	Metes 3	1			58.38702°N 13.43932°E	21300000013380
	Skara vattentorn	Oxbacken 2:1	1	1898		58.38147°N 13.43688°E	21300000013716
	Skara veterinärinrättning	Skytten 1, 2 Häggen 2 previously Sälgen 15	9			58.38901°N 13.43810°E	21300000013382
	Torps ryttmästarboställe	Torp 1:2 previously Torp 1:1	11			58.41391°N 13.67726°E	21300000012998

== Skövde Municipality ==
Image	Name	Premises	Number of buildings	Year built	Architect	Coordinates	ID
	P4, Skövde garnison	Skövde 5:259	22	1913		58.37870°N 13.84592°E	21300000016440
	Binnebergs tingshus	Binneberg 4:35	3	1750s, 1816		58.52113°N 13.86404°E	21300000013680
	Helénsgården	Bryggaren 10 previously Skövde 2:990; Bryggaren 1-5, 7	4	18th century		58.38895°N 13.84320°E	21300000013389
	Horns tegelbruk	Horns-Axtorp 1:5	12	19th century		58.51189°N 13.88565°E	21300000013706
	Hotell Billingen	Fjolner 7	1	1888	Axel; Hjalmar Kumlien, Lars Kellman	58.38987°N 13.84961°E	21300000013419
	Klagstorps herrgård	Klagstorp 2:2	5	18th century		58.33538°N 13.88522°E	21300000013299
	Vretens sågverk	Vreten 1:30	2	1886–1887		58.27704°N 13.92216°E	21300000012993
	Vaholms bro	Skövde Vaholm 3:1	1	okänt		58.58737°N 14.00023°E	21000001001755

== Sotenäs Municipality ==
Image	Name	Premises	Number of buildings	Year built	Architect	Coordinates	ID
	Hållö fyr	Vägga skärgård 1:1	1			58.33592°N 11.21733°E	21300000020948
	Smögens lotsutkik	Smögenön 1:1 previously Smögenön 1:414	2			58.35544°N 11.21943°E	21300000013079
	Åby säteri	Åby 2:1	10			58.44243°N 11.43548°E	21300000013446

== Stenungsund Municipality ==
Image	Name	Premises	Number of buildings	Year built	Architect	Coordinates	ID
	Mariagården	Stenung 3:226	2			58.07531°N 11.83473°E	21300000013303
	Smedseröds tingshus, gästgiveri	Ucklum-Smedseröd 1:1	2			58.06766°N 11.92757°E	21300000013460

== Strömstad Municipality ==
Image	Name	Premises	Number of buildings	Year built	Architect	Coordinates	ID
	Gamla Svinesundsbron	Skogar 1:5, 1:6, 1:42, 1:52, 1:69	1			59.09763°N 11.27057°E	21300000019542
	Sillsalteriet Sibirien, Sydkoster	Långegärde 1:64	1			58.89133°N 11.00787°E	21300000013442
	Strömstads station	Strömstad 4:27	1			58.93641°N 11.17364°E	21300000013421

== Svenljunga Municipality ==
Image	Name	Premises	Number of buildings	Year built	Architect	Coordinates	ID
	Hedenlund, co. vin-, spirituosahandel	Åkersta 1:1	2			57.57961°N 13.12204°E	21000001707201
	Klevs gästgiveri	Kleven 1:72	3			57.25434°N 12.98335°E	21300000013282

== Tanum Municipality ==
Image	Name	Premises	Number of buildings	Year built	Architect	Coordinates	ID
	Kaptensgården i Grebbestad	Grebbestad 7:2	1			58.69107°N 11.25605°E	21000001474580
	Florön		5			58.57962°N 11.22335°E	21300000013733
	Kiddön	Kanebo 1:3, 1:16, 1:17, 1:107	9			58.52961°N 11.24563°E	21300000013422
	Mjölkeröds gård	Mjölkeröd 1:1	9			58.75767°N 11.24655°E	21300000013426
	Tanums gästgiveri	Tanumshede 1:32	1			58.72305°N 11.32296°E	21300000013423
	Tanums tinghus	Tanumshede 1:10 previously Hede 1:10, 1:32	4			58.72226°N 11.32163°E	21300000013425

== Tibro Municipality ==
There are no listed buildings in Tibro Municipality.

== Tidaholm Municipality ==
Image	Name	Premises	Number of buildings	Year built	Architect	Coordinates	ID
	Kavlås slott	Kavlås 1:3	14			58.22688°N 13.87688°E	21300000013097
	Kungslena kungsgård	Kungslena 1:2	13			58.22779°N 13.80339°E	21300000013124
	Logen 204 Vulcan	Kv Tallen 5	2			58.17482°N 13.95159°E	21300000013439

== Tjörn Municipality ==
Image	Name	Premises	Number of buildings	Year built	Architect	Coordinates	ID
	Fjälebro	Fjälebro 2:13, 2:14	2			58.06035°N 11.70238°E	21000001471720
	Kålhuvudet	Sunna 1:16	2			58.01061°N 11.51561°E	21300000013111
	Sundsby säteri	Sundsby 2:77 previously Sundsby 2:1	8			58.07063°N 11.68910°E	21300000013483
	Valsäng strand	Valsäng 5:1	4			58.05208°N 11.59559°E	21300000013122

== Tranemo Municipality ==
Image	Name	Premises	Number of buildings	Year built	Architect	Coordinates	ID
	Torpa stenhus	Torpa 3:1 previously Torpa säteri 2:1	1			57.65000°N 13.27942°E	21300000013683

== Trollhättan Municipality ==
Image	Name	Premises	Number of buildings	Year built	Architect	Coordinates	ID
	Olidans kraftverk	Olidan 3:13	3			58.27503°N 12.27352°E	21300000021637
	Trollhätte kanal-, slussområde	Olidan 3:2; Åker 10:1	25			58.26685°N 12.26399°E	21300000015981
	Västergärdet på Olidan	Olidan 4:1, 7:1-6, 8:1-3, 9:1	12			58.27151°N 12.26798°E	21300000013729

== Töreboda Municipality ==
Image	Name	Premises	Number of buildings	Year built	Architect	Coordinates	ID
	Fredsbergs prästgård	Klockarbolet 3:1 previously Prästbol 2:1	4			58.74493°N 14.07514°E	21300000013737
	Sveneby herrgård	Sveneby 1:4	7			58.59471°N 13.94215°E	21300000013336
	Töreboda station	Björkäng 9:4 previously 9:1	1			58.70586°N 14.12853°E	21300000013455
	Valla tingshus	Valla 8:1	1			58.64390°N 14.06416°E	21300000013037

== Uddevalla Municipality ==
Image	Name	Premises	Number of buildings	Year built	Architect	Coordinates	ID
	Uddevalla centralstation	Stadskärnan 1:148	1			58.35393°N 11.92319°E	21300000013760
	Gamla rikstvåan	Grinneröds-Högen 2:1; Grinneröds-Åsen 1:13; Grinneröds-Torp 1:6-7; Myre1:10-11	none			58.19031°N 11.93824°E	21300000013045
	Gullmarsbergs säteri	Gullmarsberg 2:2	4			58.38183°N 11.65038°E	21300000013388
	Gustafsbergs bad-och kurort	Gustavsberg 1:19, 1:24 previously stg 1431, 1432	27			58.32923°N 11.90415°E	21300000013466
	Villa Carolina	Gustavsberg 1:24	2			58.32973°N 11.90398°E	21300000013462
	Villa Ekbacken	Gustavsberg 1:23	2			58.32788°N 11.90699°E	21300000013472
	Villa Elfkullen	Tureborg 1:124	3			58.34470°N 11.95339°E	21300000013470

== Ulricehamn Municipality ==
Image	Name	Premises	Number of buildings	Year built	Architect	Coordinates	ID
	Vattenverket i Ulricehamn	Bogesund 1:88, 1:253	4			57.79191°N 13.41611°E	21000001470660
	Bäckagården	Marbäck 20:2	1			57.73579°N 13.42515°E	21300000013185
	Källebacka herrgård	Källebacka 1:1	7			57.73429°N 13.44093°E	21300000013187
	Ulricehamns station	Sten Sture 1	1			57.79352°N 13.41145°E	21300000013740
	Vinsarp	Vinsarp 1:9	3			57.90000°N 13.52660°E	21300000012994

== Vara Municipality ==
Image	Name	Premises	Number of buildings	Year built	Architect	Coordinates	ID
	Huttla mill	Dampetorp 3:33	1	Early 19th century	Unknown	58.238°N 12.961°E	21000001055744

== Vårgårda Municipality ==
Image	Name	Premises	Number of buildings	Year built	Architect	Coordinates	ID
	Ljungås	Ljungås 1:1	4			57.89022°N 12.69075°E	21300000013385

== Vänersborg Municipality ==
Image	Name	Premises	Number of buildings	Year built	Architect	Coordinates	ID
	Hjobergs krukmakeri	Flicksäter 2:23	1			58.52426°N 12.14671°E	21000001274563
	Forstena	Forstena 1:2	4			58.32317°N 12.37410°E	21300000013490
	Onsjö stenhus	Onsjö 2:1	5			58.33419°N 12.33219°E	21300000013728
	Vänersborgs residens	Residenset 2	3			58.38148°N 12.32132°E	21300000013605
	Spannmålsmagasinet i Sikhall	Sikhall 1:4	1			58.48735°N 12.42729°E	21300000013042
	Torpet Solliden	Äspered 3:2 previously stg 1	3			58.33645°N 12.25697°E	21300000013488
	Västra Bodane lanthandel	Västra Bodane 2:11	3			58.52230°N 12.12260°E	21300000013031
	Västra Tunhems prästgård	Tunhem 1:42 previously Tunhem 1:1; Prästgården 1:1	14			58.30501°N 12.40747°E	21300000013506

== Åmål Municipality ==
Image	Name	Premises	Number of buildings	Year built	Architect	Coordinates	ID
	Brattenbergska huset	Kronan Större 8 previously 5	4			59.05316°N 12.70797°E	21300000013685
	Dahlgrensgården	Kronan Större 3, 7	1			59.05286°N 12.70680°E	21300000013551
	Edsleskogs prästgård	Edsleskogs prästgård 1:35, 1:38 previously 1:1	3			59.05796°N 12.46318°E	21300000012991
	Ekmansgården-Söderbergsgården	Flaggan 2	1			59.05266°N 12.70934°E	21300000013514
	Flickseminariet i Åmål	Kronan Större 5 previously 6	4			59.05275°N 12.70831°E	21300000013553
	Forsbacka herrgård	Forsbacka 1:2	6			59.08841°N 12.61830°E	21300000013687
	Hantverksföreningens hus i Åmål	Liljan Mindre 3	3			59.05184°N 12.70702°E	21300000013555
	Lilliestiernska gården	Kronan Större 1	3			59.05252°N 12.70748°E	21300000013522
	Thorstenssons mekaniska verkstad	Motorn 1	2			59.04594°N 12.69348°E	21300000013739
	Vågmästargården i Åmål	Vågmästaregården 1	3			59.05293°N 12.70610°E	21300000013572
	Waldenströmska gården	Liljan Mindre 4	3			59.05193°N 12.70726°E	21300000013564
	Stadshotellet i Åmål	Liljan Mindre 1 previously 3	2			59.05164°N 12.70642°E	21300000013554

== Öckerö Municipality ==
Image	Name	Premises	Number of buildings	Year built	Architect	Coordinates	ID
	Bremerska villan	Kalven 1:69	1			57.71121°N 11.68195°E	21300000013753
	Fyrbåken Valen	Kalven 1:3	1			57.70938°N 11.68043°E	21300000023107
