= 50 Things That Made the Modern Economy =

British radio show and podcast

- Format: Audio

Cast and voices
- Hosted by: Tim Harford

Technical specifications
- Audio format: MP3

Publication
- No. of episodes: 111
- Original release: 2016
- Provider: BBC

Related
- Related shows: A History of the World in 100 Objects
- Website: www.bbc.co.uk/programmes/p04b1g3c

50 Things That Made the Modern Economy is a radio show and podcast on the BBC World Service. It is presented by economist and journalist Tim Harford. The first series was broadcast between 5 November 2016 and 28 October 2017. A second series began on 30 March 2019.

Harford explained in a BBC interview in 2017 that his motivation for creating the show was "to paint a picture of economic change by telling the stories of the ideas, people, and tools that had far-reaching consequences". He was "fascinated" by the many unexpected outcomes, such as "the impact of the fridge on global politics, or of the gramophone on income inequality."

Towards the end of the first series, a public call was made for suggestions of a "51st thing". Harford chose six submissions for an online vote. The winning item was announced as the credit card in an episode on 28 October 2017. A bonus episode about Santa Claus was broadcast on 24 December 2018.

The first series was published in Britain as Fifty Things That Made The Modern Economy. by Little, Brown, and as Fifty Inventions That Shaped The Modern Economy in the US by Riverhead. Reviews of the book were mixed.

The show won a silver award for "Best Radio Podcast supported by UK Radioplayer" at the 2017 British Podcast Awards.

== Episodes ==
=== Series 1 (2016–2017) ===
Each of the nine-minute long programmes introduces the story of a product or invention that revolutionised the modern world.

Each episode was originally broadcast on BBC World Service, with a subsequent broadcast on BBC Radio 4 and distribution as a BBC podcast.

Series 1 episode listing with released titles and taglines
Episode	Title	Tagline	Broadcast Date
1	Diesel engine	Rudolf Diesel died in strange circumstances after changing the world with his engine	5 Nov 2016
2	Haber-Bosch process	Saving lives with thin air - by taking nitrogen from the air to make fertiliser	14 Nov 2016
3	Shipping container	The boom in global trade was caused by a simple steel box	19 Nov 2016
4	Concrete	It's improved health, school attendance, agricultural productivity and farm worker wages	26 Nov 2016
5	iPhone	How Uncle Sam played an essential role in the creation and development of the iPhone	3 Dec 2016
6	Barcode	How vast mega-stores emerged with the help of a design originally drawn in the sand	10 Dec 2016
7	Banking	Warrior monks, crusaders and the mysterious origins of modern banking	17 Dec 2016
8	Lightbulb	Once too precious to use, light is now too cheap to notice	24 Dec 2016
9	M-Pesa	Transferring money by text message is far safer and more convenient than cash	31 Dec 2016
10	Compiler	Installing Windows might take 5,000 years without it	7 Jan 2017
11	Billy bookcase	Low cost, functional and brilliantly efficient, one is produced every three seconds	14 Jan 2017
12	Antibiotics	The tale of antibiotics is a cautionary one, and economic incentives are often to blame	20 Jan 2017
13	Paper	The Gutenberg press changed the world – but it could not have done so without paper	28 Jan 2017
14	Insurance	Insurance is as old as gambling, but it's fundamental to the way the modern economy works	4 Feb 2017
15	Google	The words 'clever' and 'death' crop up less often than 'Google' in conversation	11 Feb 2017
16	Clock	The clock was invented in 1656 and has become an essential part of the modern economy	18 Feb 2017
17	Disposable razor	King Camp Gillette created the disposable razor. But his influence extends beyond shaving	25 Feb 2017
18	Robot	Robots threaten the human workforce, but they are crucial to the modern economy	4 Mar 2017
19	Public-key cryptography	Geeks versus government – the story of public key cryptography	11 Mar 2017
20	Battery	The story of the battery begins inside a dead murderer. It's a tale that's far from over	18 Mar 2017
21	Gramophone	"Superstar" economics – the story of how the gramophone led to a winner-take-all market	25 Mar 2017
22	TV dinner	The TV dinner, and other inventions from the same era, made a lasting economic impression	1 Apr 2017
23	Contraceptive pill	The pill wasn't just socially revolutionary, it also sparked an economic revolution	8 Apr 2017
24	Elevator	The safety elevator is a mass transit system that has changed the shape of our cities	15 Apr 2017
25	Air conditioning	Invented for the printing industry, air conditioning now influences where and how we live	22 Apr 2017
26	Cuneiform	Cuneiform, the earliest known script, was used to create the world's first accounts	29 Apr 2017
27	Video games	From Spacewar to Pokémon Go, video games have shaped the modern economy in surprising ways	6 May 2017
28	Intellectual property	Intellectual property reflects an economic trade off when it comes to innovation	13 May 2017
29	Passports	If anyone could work anywhere, some economists think global economic output would double	22 May 2017
30	Tally stick	The tally stick shows us what money really is: a kind of debt that can be traded freely	27 May 2017
31	Index fund	Warren Buffett is one of the world's great investors. His advice? Invest in an index fund	3 Jun 2017
32	Infant formula	For many new mothers who want, or need, to get back to work, infant formula is a godsend	10 Jun 2017
33	Tax havens	Gabriel Zucman invented an ingenious way to estimate how much wealth is hidden offshore	17 Jun 2017
34	Barbed wire	"Lighter than air, stronger than whiskey" – barbed wire wreaked huge changes in America	24 Jun 2017
35	Department store	Harry Selfridge pioneered a whole new retail experience with his London department store	1 Jul 2017
36	Leaded petrol	When lead was added to petrol it made cars more powerful – but it also poisoned people	8 Jul 2017
37	Dynamo	The big story behind the way dynamos made electricity useful	15 Jul 2017
38	Limited liability company	How some legal creativity has created vast wealth down the centuries	22 Jul 2017
39	Paper money	Currency derives value from trust in the government which issues it	29 Jul 2017
40	Seller feedback	Without seller feedback, companies like eBay might not have grown as they have	5 Aug 2017
41	Plastic	We make so much plastic these days that it takes about eight percent of oil production	12 Aug 2017
42	Market research	Market research marked a shift from a producer-led to consumer-led approach to business	19 Aug 2017
43	Radar	A high-tech 'death ray' capable of zapping sheep led to the invention of radar	26 Aug 2017
44	S-bend	The S-bend was a pipe with a curve in it, an invention that led to public sanitation	2 Sep 2017
45	Double-entry bookkeeping	Renaissance man Luca Pacioli wrote the definitive book on double-entry bookkeeping	9 Sep 2017
46	Management consulting	If managers often have a bad reputation, what should we make of the people who tell managers how to manage?	16 Sep 2017
47	Property register	Property rights for the world's poor could unlock trillions in 'dead capital'	30 Sep 2017
48	Welfare state	Do welfare states boost economic growth, or stunt it? It's not an easy question to answer	7 Sep 2017
49	Cold chain	Refrigeration revolutionised the food industry, and other industries too	14 Oct 2017
50	Plough	The plough kick-started civilisation - and ultimately made our modern economy possible	21 Oct 2017
51	Number 51	Revealed – the winning 51st Thing! Which "thing" won the vote to be added to our list?	28 Oct 2017

=== Special (2018) ===
A bonus episode on Santa Claus was broadcast on 24 December 2018. This included the announcement of the series 2 for March 2019.

=== Series 2 (2019) ===
Series 2 episode listing with released titles and taglines
Episode	Title	Tagline	Broadcast Date
1	Langstroth Hive	The Langstroth Hive: a wooden box that made the industrialisation of the bee possible	30 Mar 2019
2	Cellophane	Cellophane transformed how consumers purchased food, as well as how producers sold it	6 Apr 2019
3	Gyroscope	The gyroscope: a remarkable device used to guide everything from submarines to satellites	13 Apr 2019
4	QWERTY	From the early typewriters, the QWERTY keyboard layout has stood the test of time	20 Apr 2019
5	Bicycle	Has the bicycle had its day, or is it a technology whose best years lie ahead?	27 Apr 2019
6	Mail order catalogue	How the Montgomery Ward shopping catalogue transformed the middle-class way of life	4 May 2019
7	Brick	The humble brick has housed us for thousands of years, but how much longer will it endure?	11 May 2019
8	Spreadsheet	How a grid on a computer screen gives us a glimpse of the future of automated work.	18 May 2019
9	Recycling	Could recycling save cash, as well as the planet?	25 May 2019
10	Pornography	Did pornography help develop the internet?	1 Jun 2019
11	Dwarf wheat	Feeding a hungry world – how Norman Borlaug used genetics to tackle predicted famines	8 Jun 2019
12	"Like" button	Are we addicted to getting 'likes' on social media?	15 Jun 2019
13	Pencil	Is the pencil underrated?	22 Jun 2019
14	Blockchain	How powerful could the technology behind Bitcoin be?	22 Jun 2019
15	Factory	Have factories made workers' lives better?	29 Jun 2019
16	CubeSat	How a student engineering challenge has changed the way we use space	6 Jul 2019
17	Rubber	An everyday substance with a bloody past	13 Jul 2019
18	Postage stamp	How a disgruntled customer revolutionised the postal service	20 Jul 2019
19	RFID	Radio frequency identification is the foundation of many contactless technologies	27 Jul 2019
20	Fire	Does the story of economics really begin with a spark?	3 Aug 2019
21	Cassava	A toxic plant that sheds light on hidden social forces	10 Aug 2019
22	Solar PV	How important is solar power to the future of the planet?	17 Aug 2019
23	Chatbot	Can a computer convince you that it's human?	24 Aug 2019
24	Oil	How did the price of oil become so important?	31 Aug 2019
25	Interchangeable parts	The manufacturing revolution that started with a gun	9 Sep 2019
26	Canned food	The surprising lessons lurking under the lid	16 Sep 2019
27	Interface Message Processor	The big metal box that made the internet possible	22 Sep 2019
28	Prohibition	How much does it cost to outlaw something?	29 Sep 2019
29	Bonsack Machine	Why did a machine for making cigarettes transform the advertising industry?	6 Oct 2019
30	GPS	What would happen if GPS stopped working?	13 Oct 2019
31	Vickrey Turnstile	How did an invention that was never built help make the modern world?	20 Oct 2019
32	Glasses	A vital aid for many, but billions don't know they need them	27 Oct 2019
33	Wedgewood	What does the fashion industry owe to an 18th-century potter?	3 Nov 2019
34	SWIFT	A system that solved big problems is now facing its greatest challenge	10 Nov 2019
35	Fundraising appeal	What's the best way to get people to give to charity?	17 Nov 2019
36	Stock option	An incentive for good performance, or another way to boost executives' pay?	24 Nov 2019
37	Hollerith punch card	The machine that turned data into money	1 Dec 2019
38	Sewing machine	A device that changed women's lives was designed to make a man very rich	8 Dec 2019
39	Santa	Why does Father Christmas wear red and white?	16 Dec 2019
40	Retirement	How should we treat our elders?	23 Dec 2019
41	CCTV	How do we feel about being watched?	4 Jan 2020
42	Fast Food Franchise	Why the franchising model is such a success	11 Jan 2020
43	Wardian Case	The economic effects of a miniature greenhouse	18 Jan 2020
44	Sanitary Towel	The controversial history of a quietly revolutionary product	25 Jan 2020
45	Tulips	The Tulip-mania Bubble popped in 1637 but there were other financial bubbles	1 Feb 2020
46	Dams	How these massive structures have changed the world for many, but led to catastrophe for others	8 Feb 2020
47	Auctions	Are things only worth what people are willing to pay for them?	15 Feb 2020
48	Chess Algorithms	The history and nature of computer algorithms	22 Feb 2020
49	Slot Machines	What slot machines reveal about the business of addiction	29 Feb 2020
50	The Gutenberg Press	Why did Johannes Gutenberg struggle to make money from his invention?	7 Mar 2020

=== Bonus episodes ===
The series 1 episode on the index fund was re-released with additional comments by Harford in the podcast feed to commemorate the death of John C. Bogle.

A number of episodes of the parallel BBC radio documentary series 30 Animals That Made Us Smarter were included as bonuses in the podcast feed of early episodes of series 2.

== "51st thing" ==
The shortlist selected by Harford for public vote as the 51st thing was:

- Credit card
- Glass
- Global Positioning System (GPS)
- Irrigation
- Pencil
- Spreadsheet

The item selected by public vote was the credit card, announced by Harford in the episode entitled "Number 51".

== Book ==
Each of the short chapters describes fifty products or inventions that have revolutionised the modern world. The chapter order is different from the radio broadcast and podcast order. Some book chapters have modified titles, and the chapters are grouped into sections in the book.

Book chapter listing
Chapter	Title
Introduction
1	The Plough
I. Winners and Losers
2	Gramophone
3	Barbed Wire
4	Seller Feedback
5	Google Search
6	Passports
7	Robots
8	The Welfare State
II. Reinventing How We Live
9	Infant Formula
10	TV Dinners
11	The Pill
12	Video Games
13	Market Research
14	Air Conditioning
15	Department Stores
III. Inventing New Systems
16	The Dynamo
17	The Shipping Container
18	The Barcode
19	The Cold Chain
20	Tradable Debt and the Tally Stick
21	Billy Bookcase
22	Elevator
IV. Ideas About Ideas
23	Cuneiform
24	Public-Key Cryptography
25	Double-Entry Bookkeeping
26	Limited Liability Companies
27	Management Consulting
28	Intellectual Property
29	The Compiler
V. Where Do Inventions Come From
30	The iPhone
31	Diesel Engines
32	Clocks
33	The Haber-Bosch Process
34	Radar
35	Batteries
36	Plastic
VI. The Visible Hand
37	The Bank
38	Razors and Blades
39	Tax Havens
40	Leaded Petrol
41	Antibiotics in Farming
42	M-Pesa
43	Property Registers
VII. Inventing the Wheel
44	Paper
45	Index Funds
46	The S-bend
47	Paper Money
48	Concrete
49	Insurance
Epilogue
50	Lightbulb

== See also ==
- Category:Lists of inventions or discoveries
- A History of the World in 100 Objects
- List of business and finance podcasts
