= List of business and finance podcasts =

This is a list of business and finance podcasts.

Entries are ordered by their released dates of the first episode.

== List ==
- Business Daily
- World Business Report

=== 1983 ===
- In Business (February)

=== 1989 ===
- Marketplace

=== 1994 ===
- Wake Up to Money (March)

=== 2006 ===
- EconTalk (16 March)
- Wallstrip (16 October)

=== 2008 ===
- Planet Money (6 September)

=== 2009 ===
- This Week in Startups (1 May)
- Freakonomics Radio (1 June)

=== 2010 ===
- Employee of the Month

=== 2012 ===
- Listen Money Matters

=== 2015 ===
- Acquired

=== 2016 ===
- The Disruptive Entrepreneur (2 February)
- 50 Things That Made the Modern Economy (5 November)

=== 2017 ===
- Masters of Scale (3 May)
- Equity Mates Investing Podcast

=== 2019 ===
- Get Started Investing
- Sustainable Organizations

=== 2024 ===
- TBPN
