= Odensberg =

- Location within Västra Götaland Location within Sweden
- Coordinates: 58°09′N 13°26′E
- Country: Sweden
- Province: Västergötland
- County: Västra Götaland County
- Municipality: Falköping Municipality

Area
  - Total: 0.32 km^{2} (0.12 sq mi)

Population (31 December 2010)
  - Total: 287
  - Density: 911/km^{2} (2,360/sq mi)
- Time zone: UTC+1 (CET)
  - Summer (DST): UTC+2 (CEST)
- Climate: Dfb

Odensberg is a locality situated in Falköping Municipality, Västra Götaland County, Sweden. It had 287 inhabitants in 2010.
