= Gillis Lundgren =

Swedish designer (1929–2016)

- Born: 26 August 1929; Lund, Sweden
- Died: 25 February 2016 (aged 86); Älmhult, Sweden
- Education: Skåne Art School; Malmö Institute of Technology
- Occupations: Furniture designer, graphic designer
- Employer: IKEA

Leif Gillis Arthur Lundgren (26 August 1929 – 25 February 2016) was a Swedish furniture designer and the fourth employee of IKEA. He designed the Billy bookcase of which over 140 million have been produced.
