= Torbjörntorp =

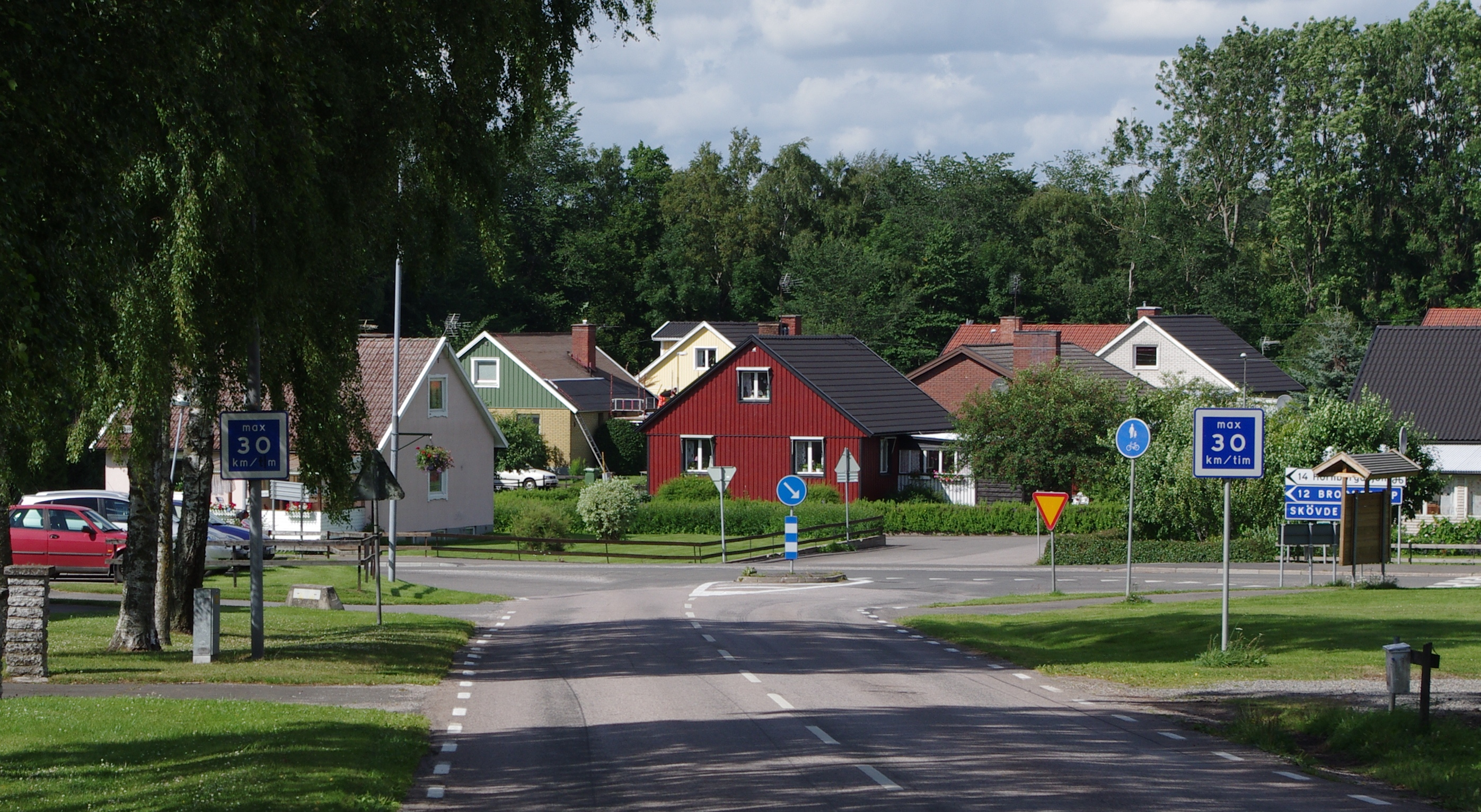
- Torbjörntorp

- Location within Västra Götaland Location within Sweden
- Coordinates: 58°13′N 13°37′E
- Country: Sweden
- Province: Västergötland
- County: Västra Götaland County
- Municipality: Falköping Municipality

Area
  - Total: 0.74 km^{2} (0.29 sq mi)

Population (31 December 2010)
  - Total: 475
  - Density: 642/km^{2} (1,660/sq mi)
- Time zone: UTC+1 (CET)
  - Summer (DST): UTC+2 (CEST)
- Climate: Dfb

Torbjörntorp is a locality situated in Falköping Municipality, Västra Götaland County, Sweden. It had 475 inhabitants in 2010.
