= Kinnarp =

- Location within Västra Götaland Location within Sweden
- Coordinates: 58°04′N 13°31′E
- Country: Sweden
- Province: Västergötland
- County: Västra Götaland County
- Municipality: Falköping Municipality

Area
  - Total: 1.28 km^{2} (0.49 sq mi)

Population (31 December 2010)
  - Total: 917
  - Density: 716/km^{2} (1,850/sq mi)
- Time zone: UTC+1 (CET)
  - Summer (DST): UTC+2 (CEST)
- Climate: Dfb

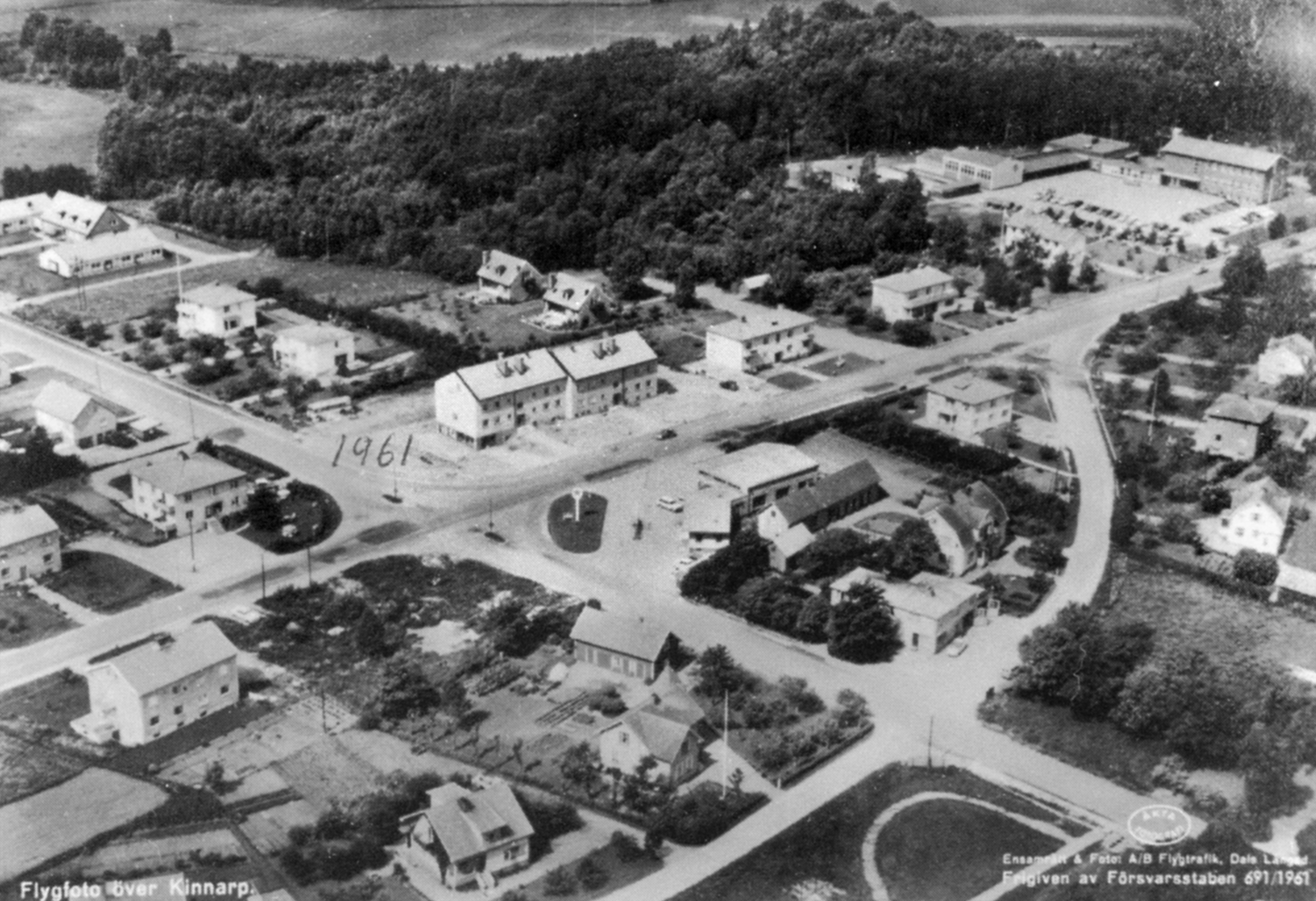
An aerial view of central Kinnarp in 1961

Kinnarp is a locality situated in Falköping Municipality, Västra Götaland County, Sweden. It had 917 inhabitants in 2010.

Kinnarp is the seat of Kinnarps, a large manufacturer of office furnishings.
