= Floby =

- Location within Västra Götaland Location within Sweden
- Coordinates: 58°08′N 13°20′E
- Country: Sweden
- Province: Västergötland
- County: Västra Götaland County
- Municipality: Falköping Municipality

Area
  - Total: 2.26 km^{2} (0.87 sq mi)

Population (31 December 2010)
  - Total: 1,499
  - Density: 662/km^{2} (1,710/sq mi)
- Time zone: UTC+1 (CET)
  - Summer (DST): UTC+2 (CEST)
- Climate: Dfb

Floby is a locality situated in Falköping Municipality, Västra Götaland County, Sweden. It had 1,499 inhabitants in 2010.

== History ==
In 1858 the first portion of the railway line connecting Stockholm and Gothenburg was opened, and a railway station was opened in the parish of Floby, near the border of the neighboring parish of Sörby, Västergötland. The station was first called Sörby, but in 1912 the name was changed to Floby.

A village with industries and services began to grow, and it had a status of municipality from 1923 to 1961. With the municipality reform of 1952, Floby became the administrative center of the Municipality of Vilske, which was amalgamated into Falköping Municipality in 1974.

After the railway station was shut down and the municipal functions were centralized in Falköping, Floby began to regress beginning in the middle of the 1970s, with reduced service and population. This backwards progress seems to have stopped in conjunction with the restoration of the train connection in 2003, when Floby became a stopping place for regional train lines.

Floby's largest business is Volvo Personvagnar AB (Volvo Car Corporation) with 500 employees, which manufactures disc brakes, hub modules, and connecting rods for the vehicle industry, and Autokaross i Floby, Inc. (with 80 employees). Many people commute to these industries from other nearby locations, but many of Floby's inhabitants commute to other locations, most commonly to Falköping.

== Notable people ==
- Johan Henrik Kellgren (1751–1795), a Swedish poet and critic.
