= IKEA Billy =

Bookcase range by IKEA

Billy
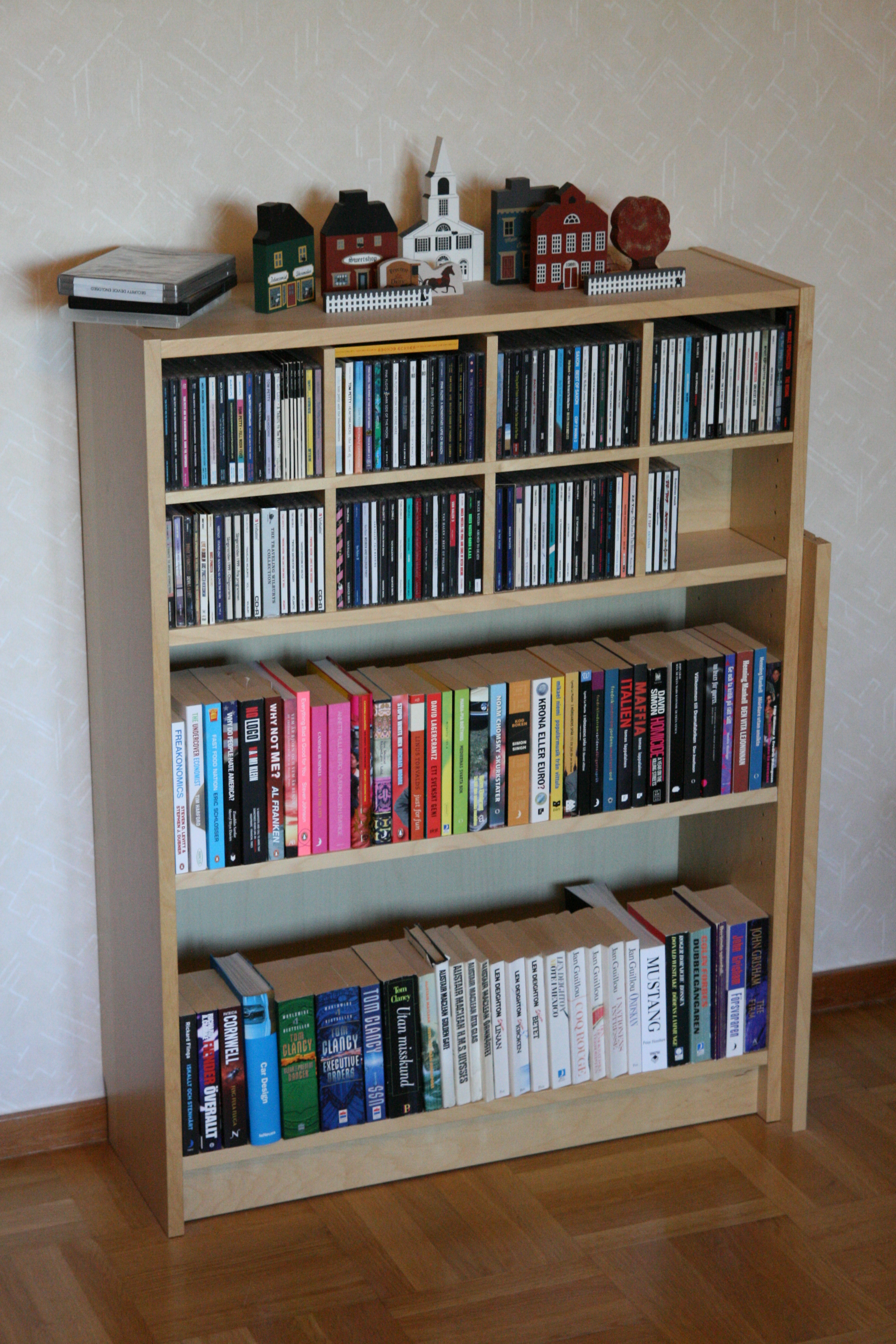
- IKEA Billy bookcase
- Type: Bookcase
- Inventor: Gillis Lundgren, IKEA of Sweden
- Inception: 1979
- Manufacturer: IKEA
- Available: Worldwide
- Current supplier: Gyllensvaans Möbler
- Last production year: 2022 (reworked version)
- Models: Various sizes and finishes
- Notes; Over 140 million units sold by 2023. Manufactured in Sweden, Germany, Slovakia, and China.

Billy (stylised as BILLY) is a bookcase sold by the Swedish furniture company IKEA. It was developed in 1979 by the Swedish designer Gillis Lundgren, and IKEA has sold over 140 million units of the bookcases worldwide. Its popularity and global spread have led to its use as a price index.

== Construction ==
The shelf parts are made of melamine-coated or veneered particle board. The edges are covered with plastic strips. The shelves are placed on brass flanged pins, which are themselves inserted into holes with a vertical distance of 32 mm. The shelves are available in several colours and finishes, with widths of 40 or 80 cm. The bookshelves can be coupled, and optional doors can be added. The bookcases are sold in flat-pack form, to be assembled by the purchaser.

Billy bookcases are manufactured in factories in Sweden, Germany, Slovakia, and China. It is manufactured for IKEA by Gyllensvaans Möbler at their factory in Kattilstorp, Sweden. In 2009, 130,000 bookshelves were produced each week.

== History ==
In 1979, Gillis Lundgren, the fourth employee of IKEA, designed the first bookcase in the Billy line. His initial sketches for the bookcase were done on the back of a napkin. When designing the product, emphasis was placed on functionality and flexibility, recognizing that different homes had varying requirements and space availability. Lundgren also believed that the bookcase was an item of furniture that consumers might later wish to expand as their collections grew, and he wanted to ensure his design was "attractive and timeless" so that it would remain in demand and not fall out of fashion. The name Billy was chosen by Lundgren after an IKEA advertising manager named Billy Liljedahl stated that he wanted "a proper bookcase just for books" to be designed.

The 1979 edition of the IKEA Catalogue was the first to include the Billy bookcase.

In 1988, the width of the bookcases, initially 90 cm (35 in), was revised down to 80 cm (31 in), in response to complaints from customers that the shelves bent under the weight of the books, as well as the fact that the item did not fit on the IKEA in-store transport pallets.

In 1992, a German newspaper and television station conducted tests on 18 Billy bookshelves and found that the formaldehyde vapour levels released by 8 of them were higher than permitted by regulation. The source of the vapour was traced to the lacquer used by the company on the bookshelf, and IKEA was forced to stop all production and sales of the bookshelves until the problem could be fixed. The cost to IKEA of the incident was estimated to be between US$6 and $7 million (equivalent to $16 million in 2025).

In 1999, IKEA replaced the lacquer coating on the white bookcase with melamine foil.

In 2009, Bloomberg initiated a "Billy bookcase index", as an adjunct to the Big Mac index, to compare relative price levels in different countries around the world.

From 2011 to 2014, Billy was available as a 40 cm (16 in) deep variant alongside the standard 28 cm (11 in) deep versions.

In 2014, reinforced shelves and rounded edges were introduced.

In 2020, IKEA began reworking the bookcase, switching from wood veneer to paper foil and replacing metal nails with plastic fasteners.

In 2022, IKEA began producing the reworked version of the bookcase.

== Sales ==
As of 2020 IKEA estimates that on average one Billy bookcase is sold every five seconds. In 2009, IKEA stated that they had sold 41 million of the bookcases. In 2017, the BBC reported that sales had exceeded 60 million units. By 2023, IKEA had sold over 140 million units.

== Gallery ==
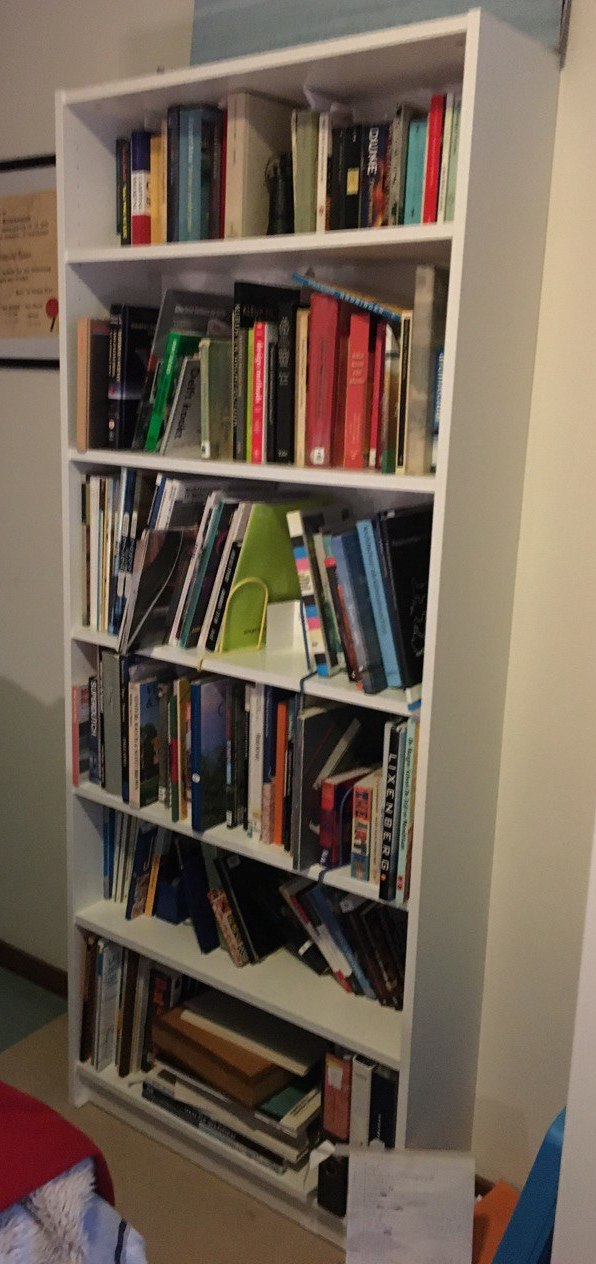
Standard model

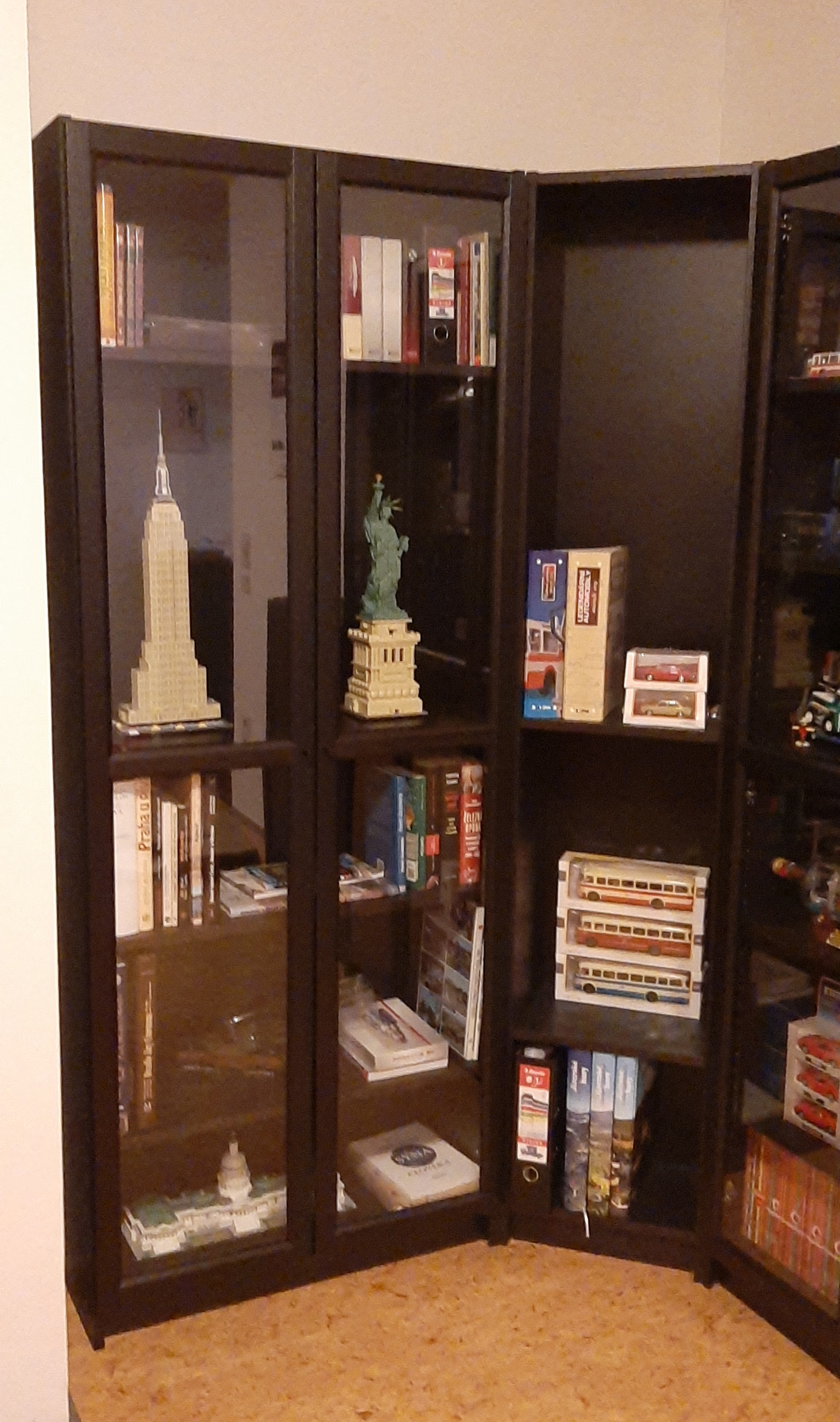
Corner model

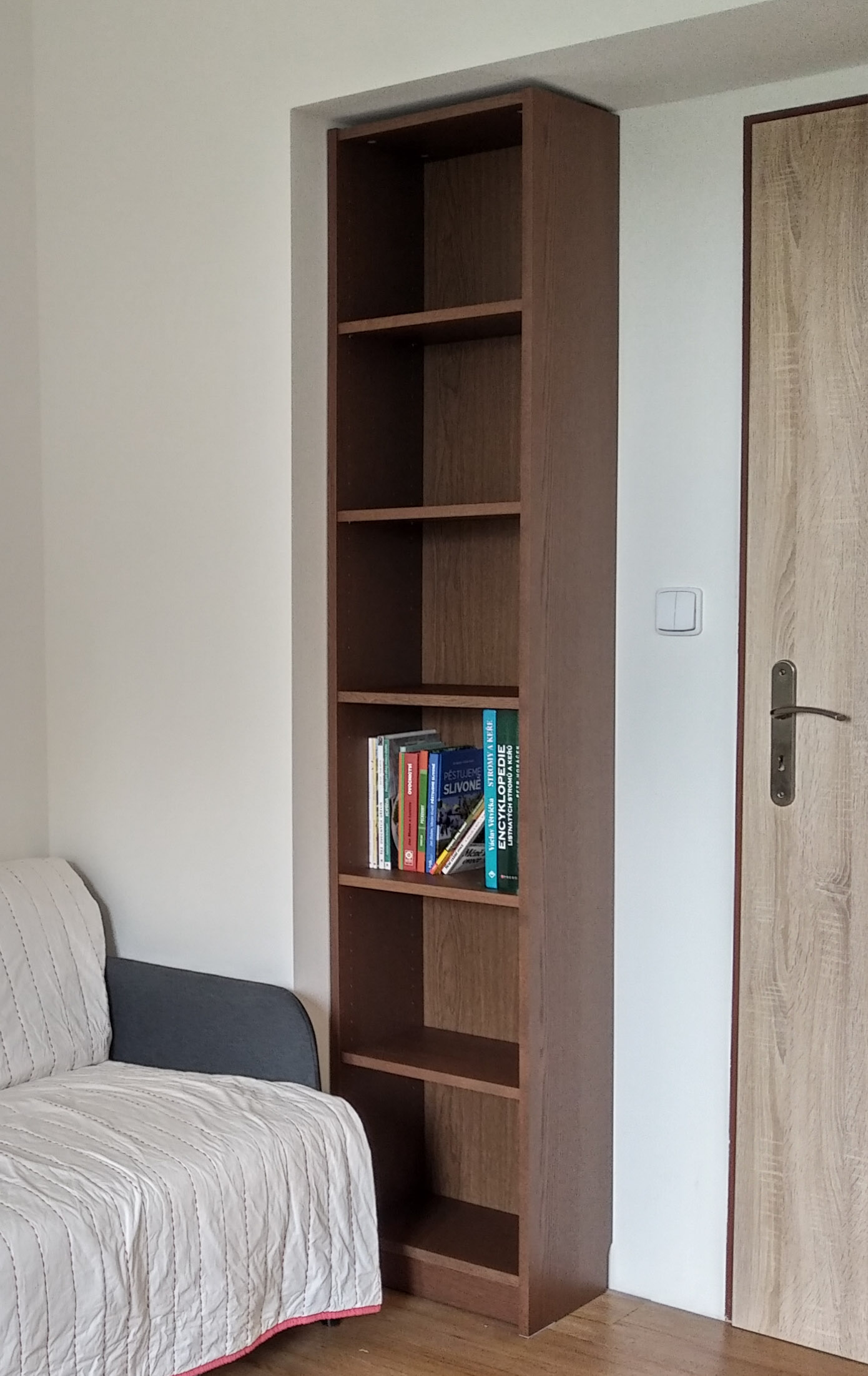
Narrow model
