= Gökhem =

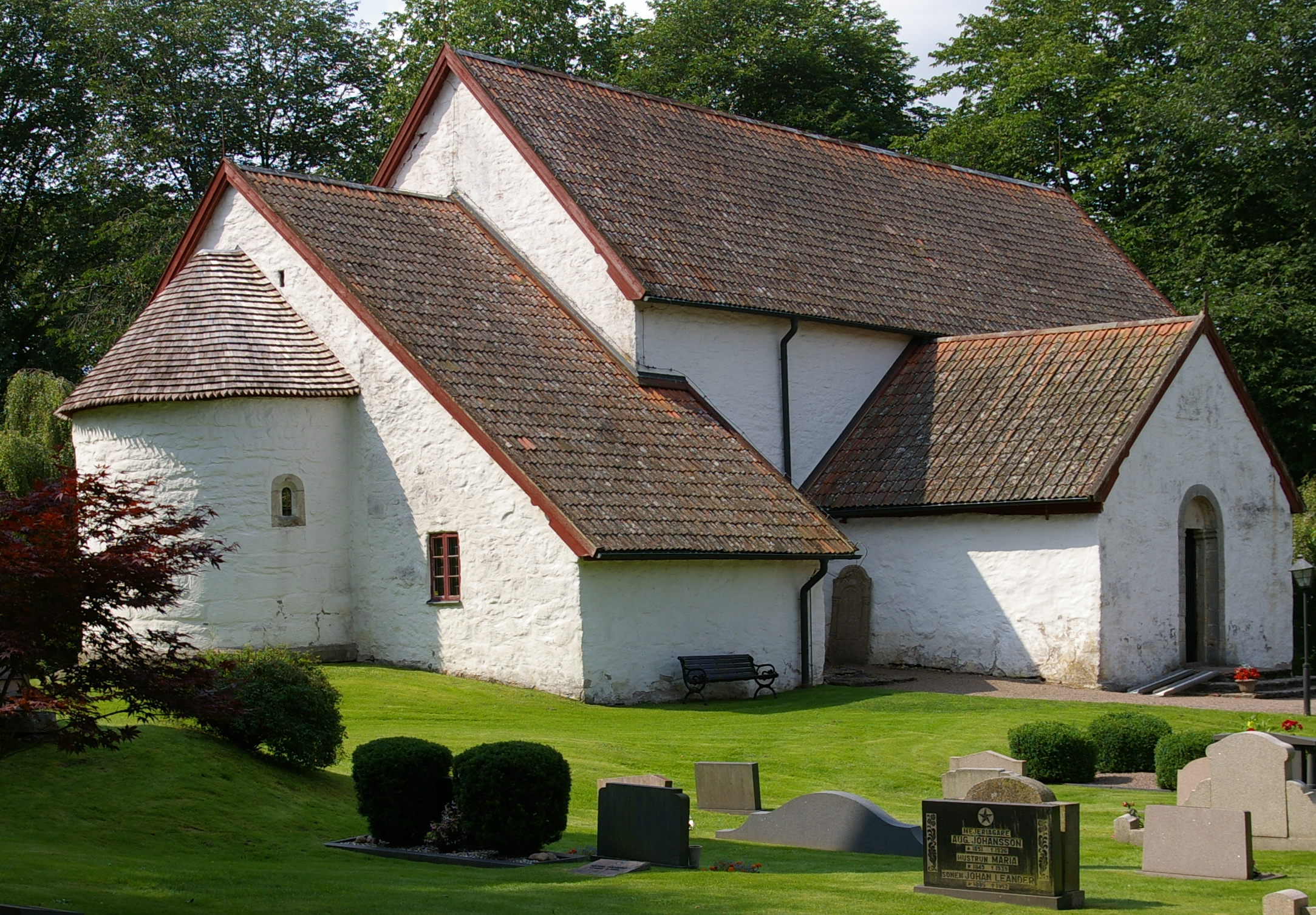
- Gökhem Church

- Location within Västra Götaland Location within Sweden
- Coordinates: 58°10′25″N 13°24′27″E
- Country: Sweden
- Province: Västergötland
- County: Västra Götaland County
- Municipality: Falköping Municipality
- Time zone: UTC+1 (CET)
  - Summer (DST): UTC+2 (CEST)

Gökhem in Västergötland was originally part of Vilske härad and is since 1974, a part of the Falköping Municipality.

Gökhem Church is in Gökhem.
