= Vartofta =

- Location within Västra Götaland Location within Sweden
- Coordinates: 58°06′N 13°38′E
- Country: Sweden
- Province: Västergötland
- County: Västra Götaland County
- Municipality: Falköping Municipality

Area
  - Total: 0.62 km^{2} (0.24 sq mi)

Population (31 December 2010)
  - Total: 540
  - Density: 864/km^{2} (2,240/sq mi)
- Time zone: UTC+1 (CET)
  - Summer (DST): UTC+2 (CEST)
- Climate: Dfb

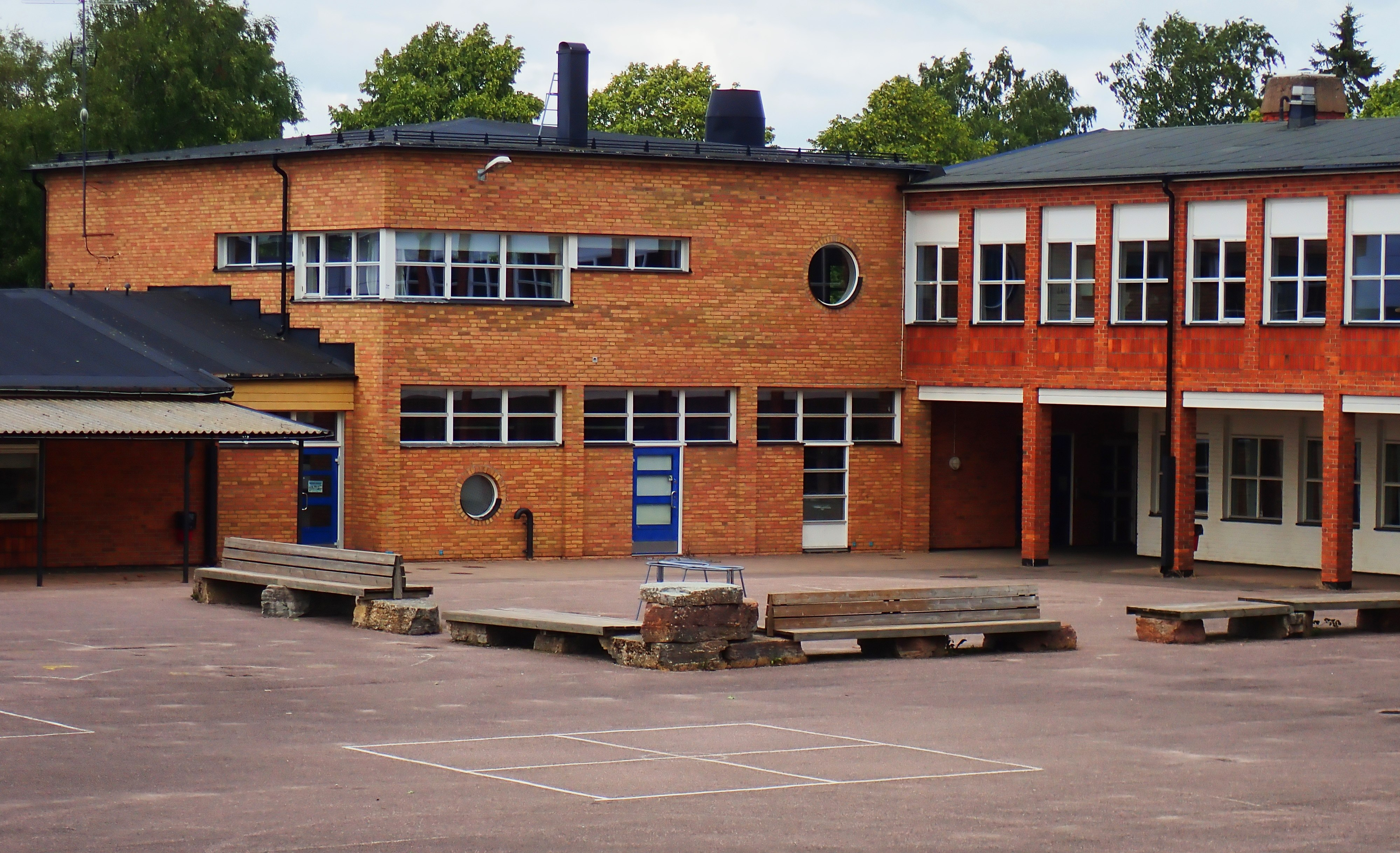
A primary school in Vartofta

Vartofta is a locality situated in Falköping Municipality, Västra Götaland County, Sweden. It had 540 inhabitants in 2010.

Vartofta Hundred, or Vartofta härad, was a hundred divided between Småland and Västergötland in Sweden.
