= Light railway of the Ryttaren Peat Factory =

Coordinates: 58.020556°N 13.736667°E

Ryttaren Peat Factory
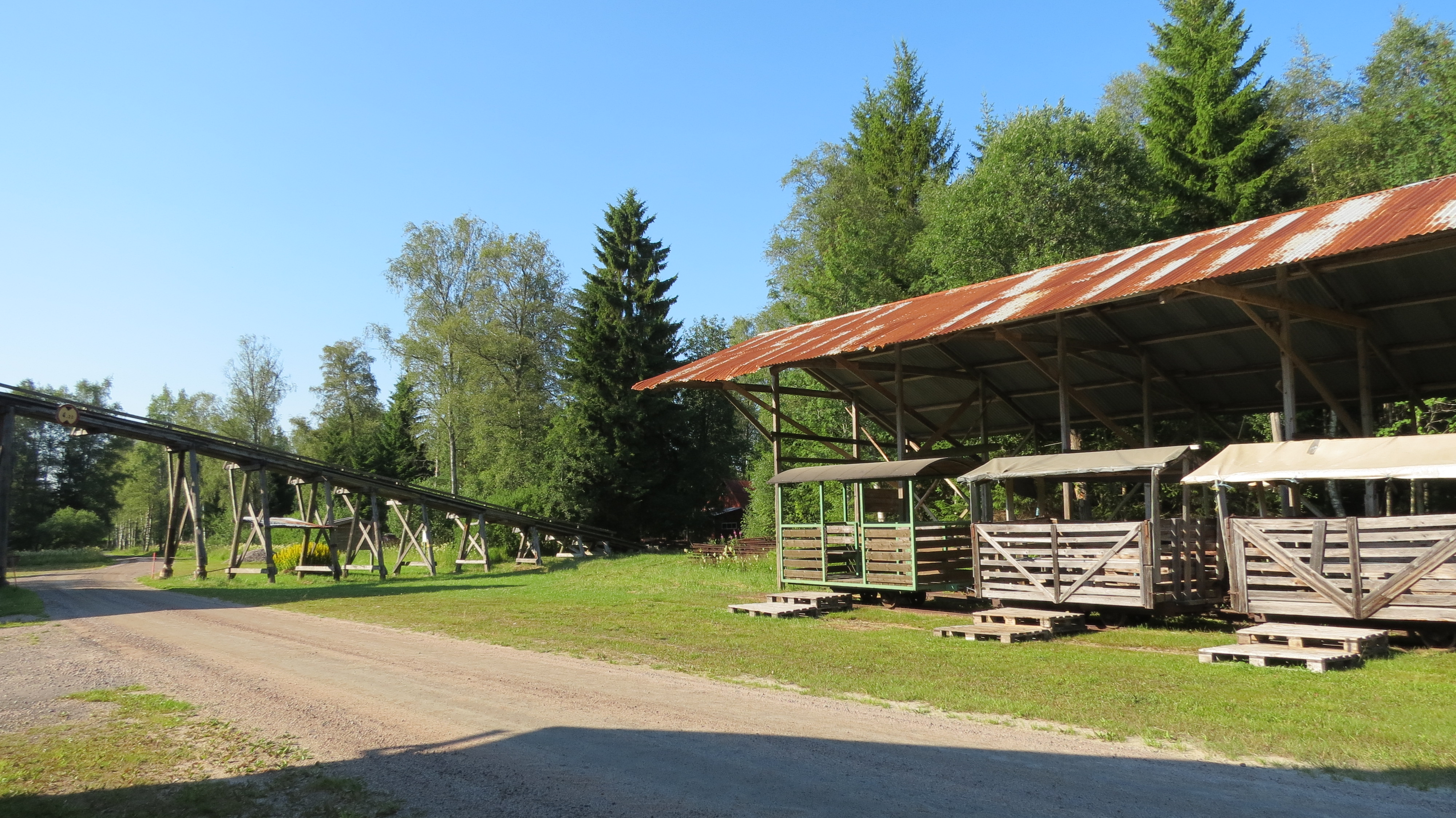
- Light railway of the Ryttaren Peat Factory

Technical
- Line length: 3.5 kilometres (2 mi)
- Track gauge: 600 mm (1 ft 11 5/8 in)
Route map
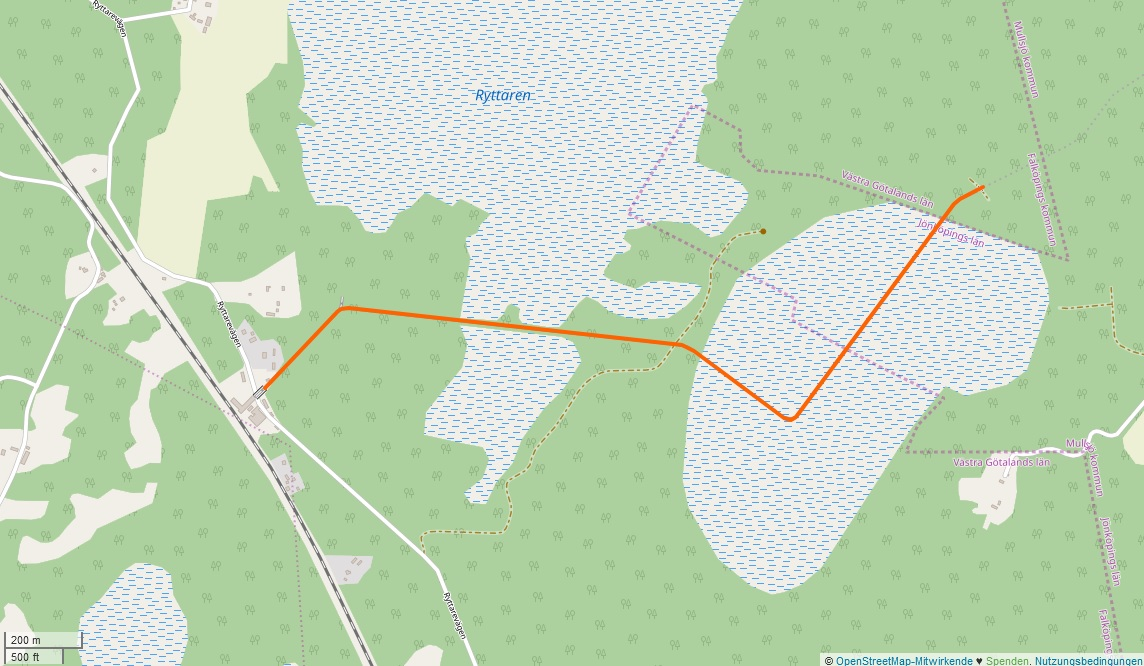
Heritage railway

The light railway of the Ryttaren Peat Factory is a 3.5 kilometres (2 mi) long narrow-gauge railway with a gauge of 600 mm (1 ft 11 5/8 in) near Kättilstorp in Falköping Municipality in Västergötland in western Sweden, which is still operated as a heritage railway. Since 2012, the former factory has been protected as an industrial monument (Byggnadsminne) in accordance with the provisions of the Swedish Cultural Heritage Act.

== History ==
=== Ryttaren Peat Factory ===
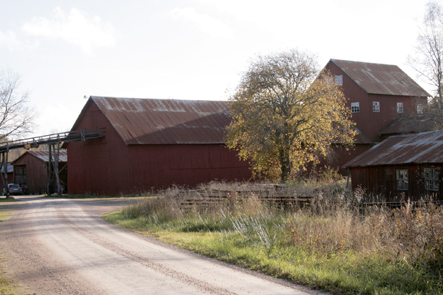
Ryttaren Peat Factory

The construction of the Ryttaren Peat Factory began in the spring of 1906. At the same time the light rail track from the factory to the moor was built. On 7 May 1906, an order was placed at AB Wilhelm Sonesson & Co. for 4,100 metres (4,500 yd) of transportable rail sections, plus five switches, 24 wheel sets with double track rings and a trolley.

The agricultural scientist Nils Hartelius founded the Ryttaren peat stock corporation in Grimstorp in 1906. In the same year the factory was built next to the railway between Falköping and Nässjö to extract peat from the Ryttaren moor. The peat was mainly used for animal bedding, dry toilets and packaging of fruit. The factory had three balers with an annual production capacity of 75,000 bales. During the high season, up to 200 people were employed in the factory and in the moor. Foreman Notary Karlsson was plant manager from the beginning until his retirement in 1938.

The factory was bought in 1964 by Hasselfors Bruks AB to produce peat for horticulture. Peat cutting at Ljunghemsmossen finished in 1995, peat production ceased in 1997.

=== Light railway ===
The first line was built from the factory 400 metres (440 yd) to the northeast, where it branched-off into two parallel tracks at a distance of 500 metres (550 yd) to the northern part of the moor.

The rail system was then gradually extended to cover the southern part of the bog. In 1947, a major overhaul of the main line was carried out. New sleepers were installed and the rails weighing 5 kg/m (10 lbs/yd) were replaced by those weighing 7 kg/m (14 lbs/yd). At the same time, one of the northern lines was dismantled.

In 1953 and 1954 the track network was further extended by the construction of lines to the Ljunghem and Ekelund Bogs. The 10.5 kilometres (6.5 mi) rail network had then its maximum extension. After the takeover of the plant by Hasselfors Bruks AB in 1964, the line was again significantly relaid.

In 1985 the line to Ekelund Bog and the rest of the northern line were demolished. In autumn 1996 the demolition of the track to the Ljunghem Bog began. Two kilometres (1 1/4 miles) at the end of the line were lifted, before the demolition was stopped. Today, more than three kilometres (1 7/8 miles) of the line are still in good condition and can be used for tourist traffic.

=== Operation ===
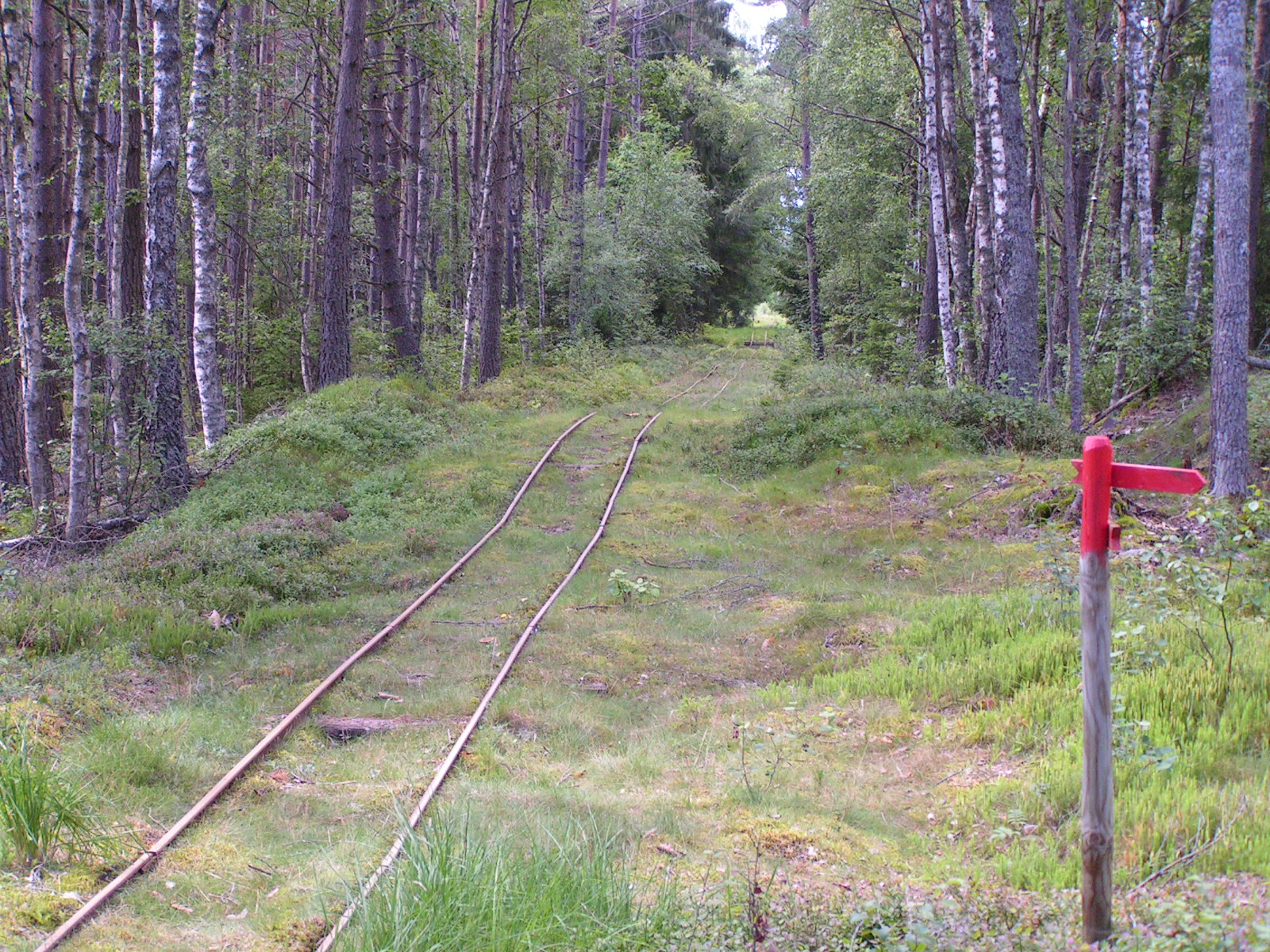
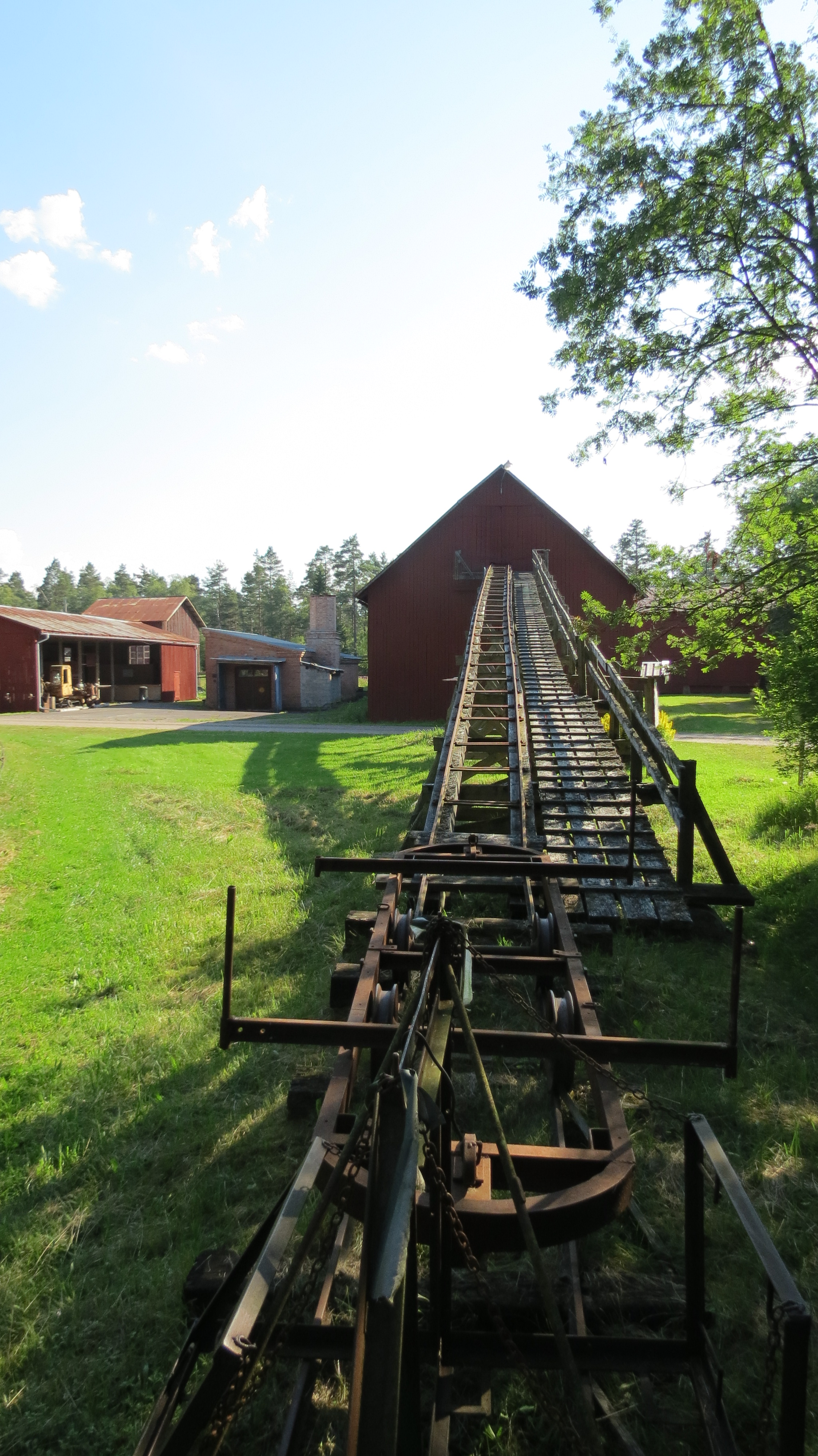
Light railway of the Ryttaren Peat Factory

The first section of the northern line No 1 was opened in 1906. Horses were used here from 1906 to 1913 and during the war. The railway embankment was partly reinforced with gravel so that the horses could walk on it.

In 1913 a locomotive was bought from Varbergs Gjuteri och Mekaniska Verkstad. The locomotive was up for sale again in 1915. 1918 an 8 hp kerosene locomotive from Vara Mekaniska Verkstad followed, which cost 6295 crowns. It was sold in 1925 to Stockaryds Torvströ AB for 900 crowns.

In 1924 an Austro-Daimler locomotive built in Vienna was put on the line. The petrol-driven locomotive#Motor Locomotive had 6 hp, cost 2650 crowns and was scrapped around 1940.

Next came a locomotive from Berg & Co. Mek. Verkstad in Lindesberg (Bergbolagen, BB) in 1939. It had a small air-cooled petrol engine, which was replaced in the same year by a two-cylinder Pentamotor with transmission. In 1941 the locomotive was converted to electric operation. It was equipped with Tudor accumulators, an ASEA DC motor and a driver's cab. Due to the small radius of action, it was then only used for short distances. The locomotive was used until the 1960s and was scrapped. The chassis remained in Ryttaren until the mid-1980s, when it was transferred to the Frövi Industrial Railway Museum and used for building a steam locomotive.

Locomotive 175/1943 was built by Sydsvenska Kraft in 1942 for the construction of a power station in Traryd by E. W. Lundströms Mekaniska Verkstads AB (EWL) in Limhamn. After completion of the power plant construction, the locomotive was resold via the machine shop of L. H. Sandström in Månsarp. In 1957, it was sold to the Fälhult Peat Factory in Älmhult. In 1983 AB Sejle Myr in Kärraboda bought the machine, which came to Ryttaren in 2002. In Fälhult the locomotive was equipped with a six-cylinder petrol engine from Volvo. In the meantime this was replaced by a Mercedes four-cylinder diesel engine. The locomotive is used for work trains only, as it is too light for passenger service.

In the summer of 1948, a locomotive was borrowed from Röde Mosse Peat Factory in Härlingstorp. After a fire in the factory in 1947, the lost production of the previous year had to be made up. The locomotive was manufactured in 1917 by Söderbloms Gjuteri AB in Eskilstuna. It was equipped with a 10 hp kerosene engine. This was later replaced by a Chevrolet petrol engine.

During the expansion of the rail network from 1953 to 1954, it turned out that the electric Bergbolagen locomotive was not sufficient for the long transports from the moors of Ljunghems and Ekelund. The purchase of a new locomotive became necessary. It was decided to build the locomotive under their own management. The order went to engineer Måns Hartelius. Måns was the brother of the former managing director of the peat factory, Hans Hartelius, and worked for Volvo in Gothenburg, where he was responsible for Volvo's military vehicle development programme. The chassis was built around a steel frame and fitted with an individual wheel suspension to ensure maximum tracking on the rails and thus avoid derailment. A two-cylinder Pentamotor was chosen as the drive source. Power was transmitted via an intermediate shaft. The V-belt of the engine drove a generator, which generates electricity for an electric motor. The power was transmitted from the electric motor via chains to the axles. This ensured smooth starting, jerk-free driving and stepless speed changes. The lubrication of all drive chains and the sanding of all wheelswas carried out via tubes from the driver's cab. Its generator was manufactured by ASEA and delivered a maximum output of 11.2 kW at 70 volts DC. The Pentamotor was replaced in 1968 by a 60 HP Volvo engine of type B16. The locomotive used as a service locomotive is called Harteliusloket.

== Museum ==
The Ryttaren peat factory is an industrial monument from the early 1900s that can still be seen today. It has a factory, machine houses, workers' homes with farm buildings, sawmills and peat bogs. The Ryttaren peat factory has been run as an open-air museum by the Föreningen Ryttarens torvströfabrik association since 1999. In 2004 it was voted Industrial Monument of the Year by the Swedish Industrial Monuments Association (Svenska Industriminnesföreningen). It was listed as Industrial Heritage Monument (Byggnadsminne) in 2012.

The museum is open and the railway is operated on weekends in July and August and on the Torvens dag in September.
