= Listen Money Matters =

Finance website and podcast

- Genre: Business; finance
- Language: English

Creative team
- Created by: Andrew Fiebert

Cast and voices
- Hosted by: Andrew Fiebert; Thomas Frank; Matt Giovanisci

Publication
- Original release: 2012 – 2020/05/10
- Updates: Weekly

Related
- Website: listenmoneymatters.com

Listen Money Matters is an American personal finance website and weekly podcast created by Andrew Fiebert in December 2012. The podcast describes itself as "honest and uncensored" and emphasizes a relatable, informal tone. Matt Giovanisci served as co-host until 2015, when he was replaced by Thomas Frank. Since the podcast's debut, the brand has expanded to include a community forum, book club, and a 2014 book, Mastering Mint.

== History ==
Listen Money Matters was founded in December 2012 by Andrew Fiebert. Fiebert had been displaced by Hurricane Sandy and was reconsidering his personal finances, and future co-host Matt Giovanisci, who at the time was heavily in debt, had turned to Fiebert for financial advice. Giovanisci says that he and Fiebert sought to create a podcast that "wasn't just two boring white dudes on the Internet spouting off about how they should be investing in Vanguard mutual funds... The idea was to be fun, joke, curse, drink, and just be real people who happen to be sneaking in some personal finance information".

Business Insider named Listen Money Matters one of their "11 podcasts to listen to if you want to get rich", writing that "This lively show... will keep you alert and laughing. The hosts offer actionable personal finance advice, and deliver it in a very raw and honest tone." Forbes has described the podcast as a "hit" that "has millennials all over America listening". In 2015, Instavest named Listen Money Matters as one of the "Six Best Personal Finance Podcasters on the Internet".

In 2014, Fiebert and Giovanisci released a book, Mastering Mint, advising investors on how to manage their finances with the service Mint.com. In May 2015, Listen Money Matters produced a rap video about personal finance titled "All My Money". Quartz wrote of the video that "it's rare to come across something [in financial discussions] as fun—and actually educational—as this rap video".

== Founders ==
Andrew Fiebert took a job as a data engineer at an investment bank following college. After Hurricane Sandy struck the Eastern United States in October 2012, he was forced to move back in with his parents. The experience caused him to reconsider his finances, and his wife suggested that he put his thoughts into a podcast. He describes himself as Listen Money Matters' "Chief Nerd".

Matt Giovanisci left the podcast in 2015 to concentrate on his Swim University brand, which produces a podcast and other material on pool and hot tub maintenance. He was replaced on the podcast by Thomas Frank of College Info Geek.

On the podcast's July 23, 2018, episode, Frank announced that he would be stepping down and that Giovanisci would return as co-host.
