= Kättilstorp =

- Location within Västra Götaland Location within Sweden
- Coordinates: 58°02′30″N 13°42′30″E
- Country: Sweden
- Province: Västergötland
- County: Västra Götaland County
- Municipality: Falköping Municipality

Area
  - Total: 0.44 km^{2} (0.17 sq mi)

Population (31 December 2010)
  - Total: 253
  - Density: 571/km^{2} (1,480/sq mi)
- Time zone: UTC+1 (CET)
  - Summer (DST): UTC+2 (CEST)
- Climate: Dfb

Kättilstorp is a locality situated in Falköping Municipality, Västergötland, Sweden. It had 253 inhabitants in 2010.

It is known because of the Ryttaren Peat Factory and its light railway.
