= Huttla mill =

Swedish water- and sawmill from the 19th century

Huttla Mill
- Huttla kvarn (Swedish)
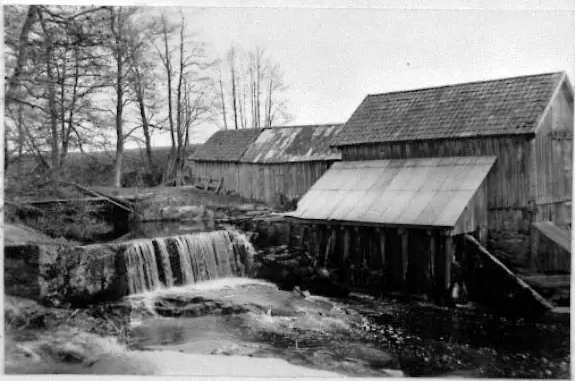
- The Huttla mill as it appeared in 1951
- Interactive map of the Huttla Mill area

General information
- Location: Vara, Sweden, Sweden
- Coordinates: 58°14′17″N 12°57′42″E
- Year built: Early 19th century

Huttla Mill (Swedish: Huttla kvarn) is a watermill and sawmill located on Afsån, a tributary of the Lidan River, in the district of Naum outside of the town of Vara, Sweden. The mill is believed to have been built in the early 19th century and the first recorded mention of it is in 1876. Its name comes from the old Swedish word huttla, which means uneven accumulation, for occasionally the river would flow in an irregular manner making the mill's production unsteady. It is also referred to as Dampetorp Mill.

The facility has been overseen and renovated by Naum's local historical society after taking it over in the 1950s when it ceased operations. There are various structures on the grounds near the mill, including an old forge, a barn, a community center, museum, and some others that were relocated to the site and built by the historical society in the same fashion as the original mill. There are picnic and barbecue facilities available. Visiting is gratis but buildings are locked; parking is freely available. The premises can be rented (e.g., for weddings). The mill and the other historical buildings are easily accessible from the E20 which has an exit to the mill which is marked with a Swedish place of interest sign.

The site is one of the listed buildings in Sweden, affording it the strongest legal, cultural, and historical protection available.

== History ==
The mill was established at the beginning of the 19th century. Johannes Svensson tenanted it from 1855 to 1862. In 1862, Johannes Eriksson and Stina-Lena Andersdotter took over the tenancy. During that decade, the mill burnt down and was rebuilt. In 1874, Svensson and Andersdotter purchased the mill and the waterfall for 133 krona and 33 öre. Adersdotter died in 1895, and Svensson remarried to Greta Svensdotter in 1892. They had five children, including Karl J. Johanesson, who leased the mill in 1904 from his siblings who had jointly inherited it together with him. His oldest son, Olof Johansson, tenanted the mill from 1944 and purchased it in 1957. Bengt and Hans Hillerbäck acquired it in 1959, and donated the land and mill to Naum's local historical society (Swedish: hembygdsföreningen) in 1979 after it had ceased operations.

In 1980 and 81, the historical society renovated the mill and saw. In 1982, the community started observing something they called Huttla Day on August 31 each year. To host such celebrations, weddings, and other festivities, a community center and party hall was built on the grounds and inaugurated on August 18, 1995. This building also serves as a museum. While there was a years-long break in celebrating the holiday, it was revived in 2024 when the society, originally formed in 1924, celebrated its 100th anniversary on the grounds. The rejuvenation of the society has continued with additional festivities under the current leadership of Chairman Fredrik Handfast.

== Machinery and equipment ==
Originally, the mill was powered by a water wheel which drew power from a wooden flume. It used these to drive two millstones that were 4.5 metres (15 ft) in diameter. These stones would mill wheat into millfeed. The water wheel was upgraded in 1876 to have multiple water turbines instead. In the early 20th century, the mill was equipped with a sieve.

The sawmill had a belt-driven planner and a small water wheel. The sawmill also had a frame saw with a wooden tripod frame. Multiple stock wagons, one with a pressure feed, were used. Other nominal equipment was employed to produce lumber.

The site also had a forge and the associated equipment thereof (e.g., hammers, anvil, etc.).

== Photos ==
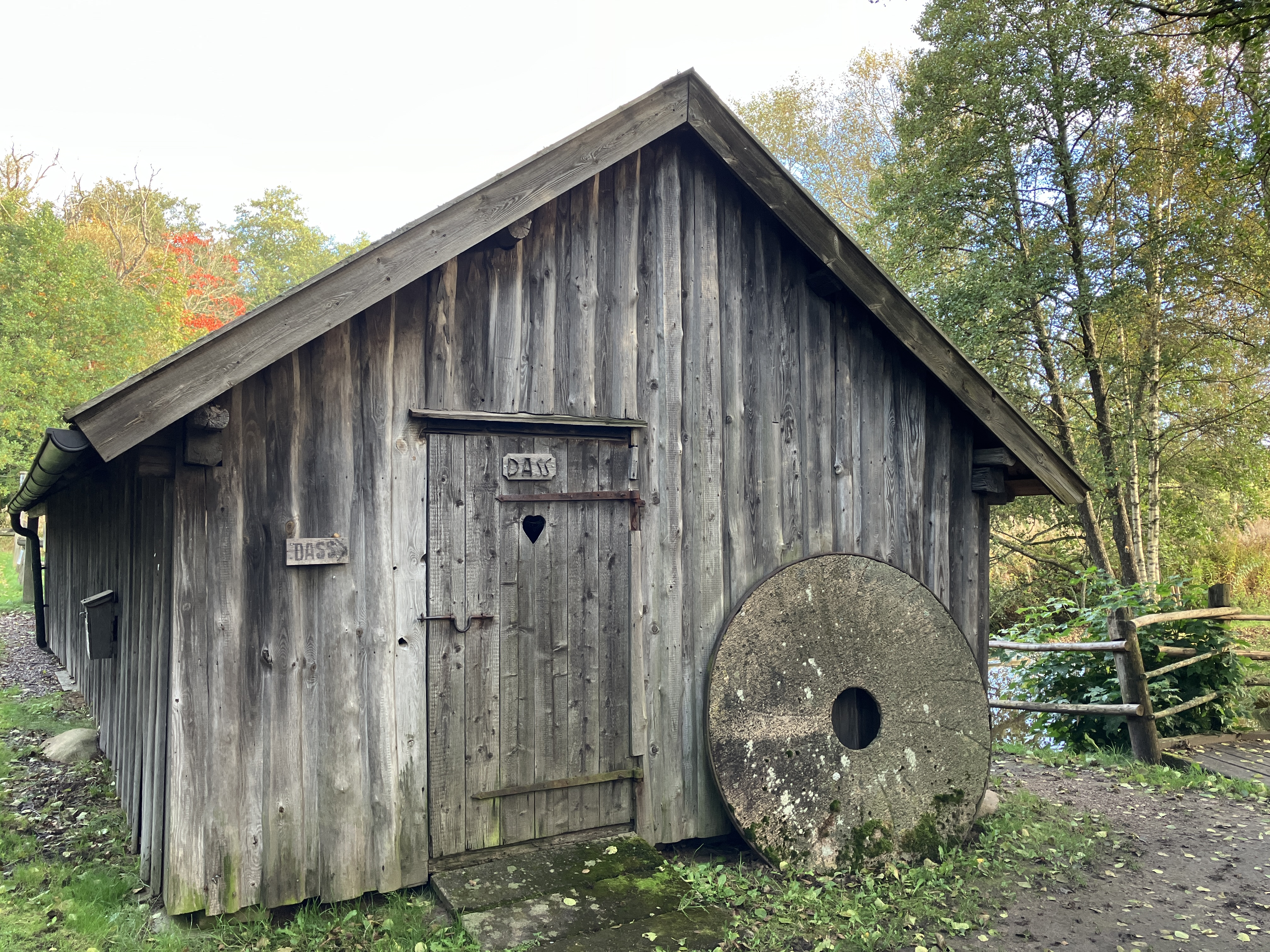
Huttla Mill

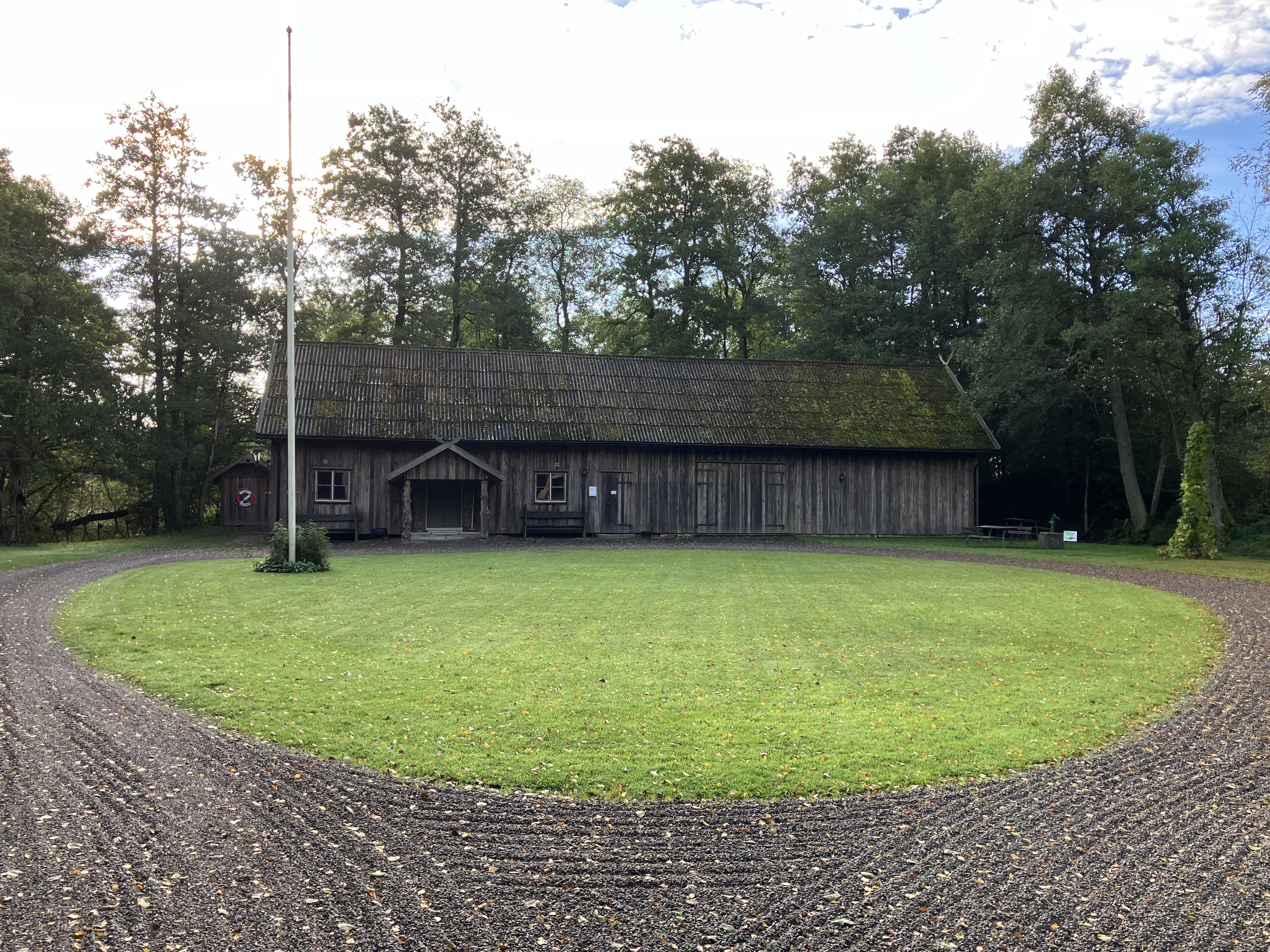
Huttla Mill Museum

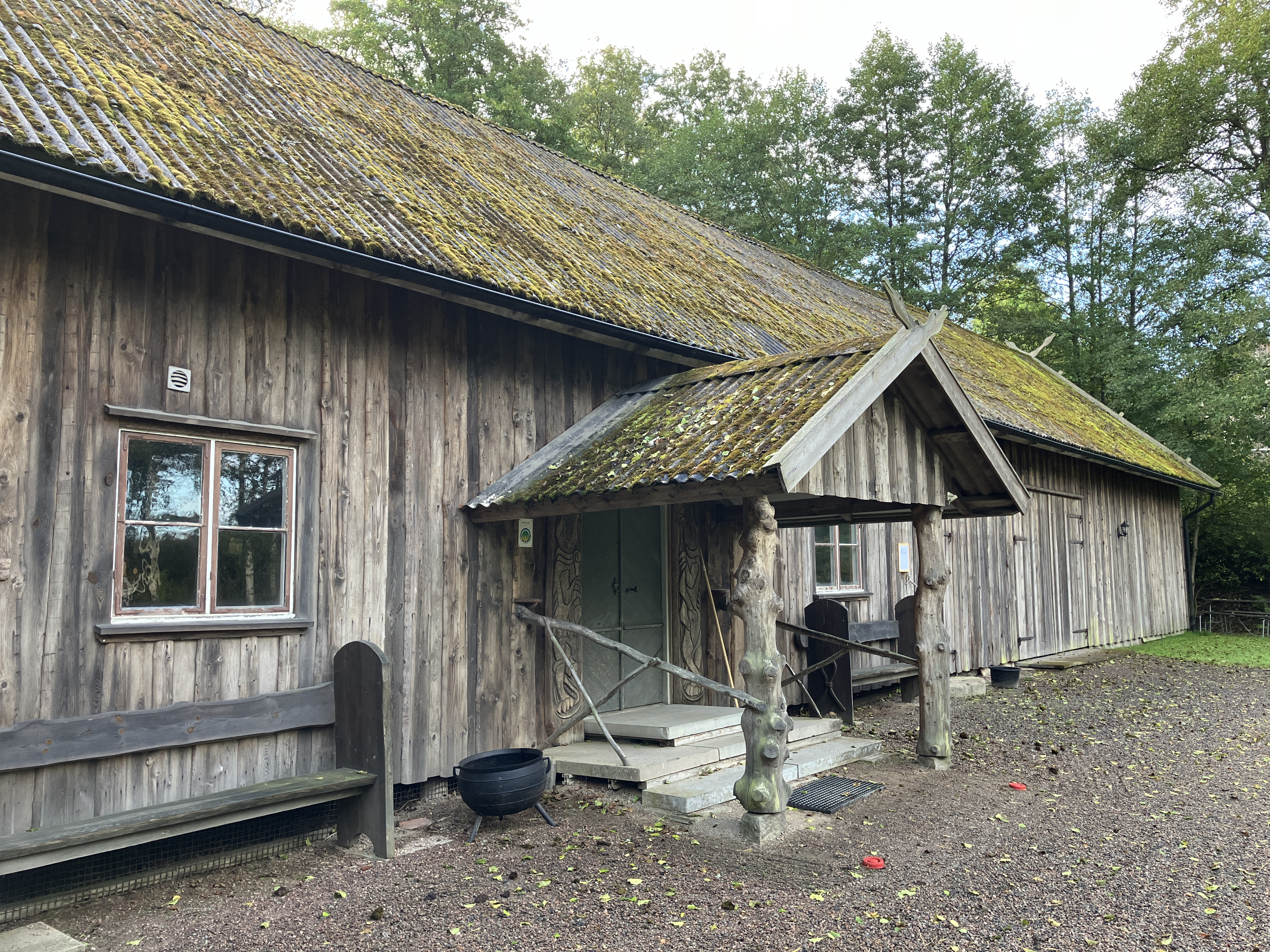
Huttla Mill Museum from an angle

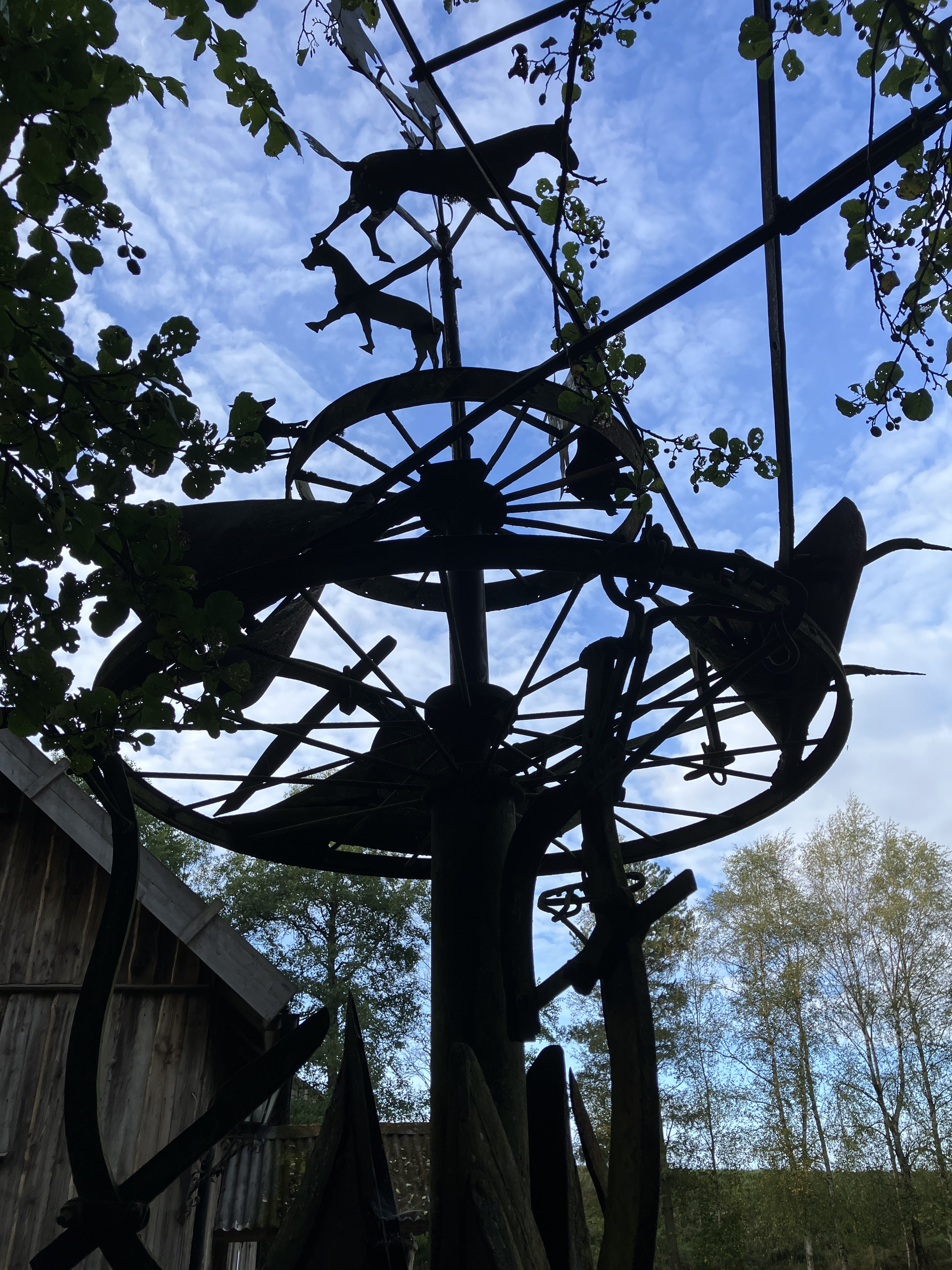
Huttla Mill sculpture outside the museum
