= Bergslagsbanans station =

Railway station in Gothenburg, Sweden

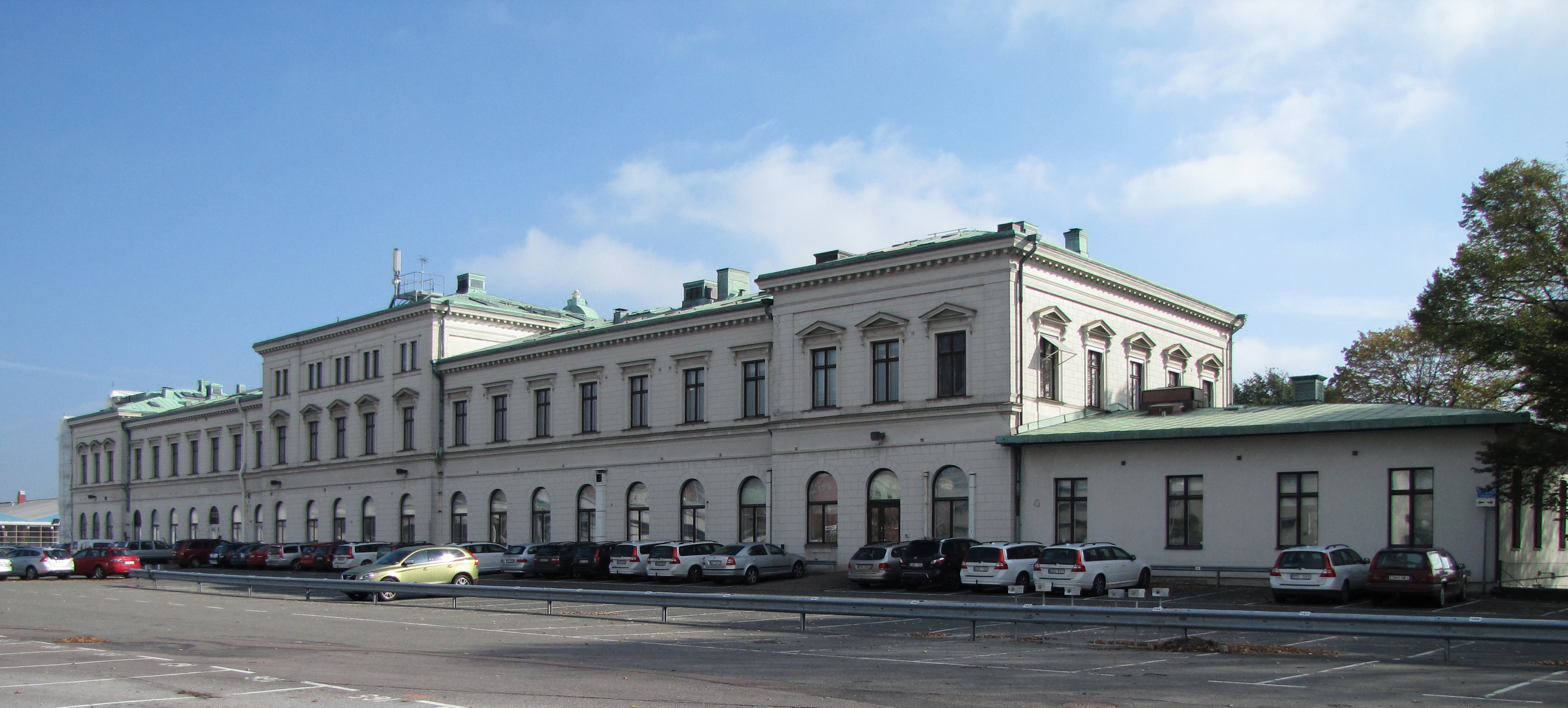
- Bergslagsbanans station in 2011

General information
- Location: Gothenburg; Sweden
- Coordinates: 57.7124°N 11.9737°E
- Operator: SJ AB

Construction
- Architect: Axel Kumlien and Hjalmar Kumlien

History
- Opened: 1881
- Original company: Bergslagernas Järnvägar
Location

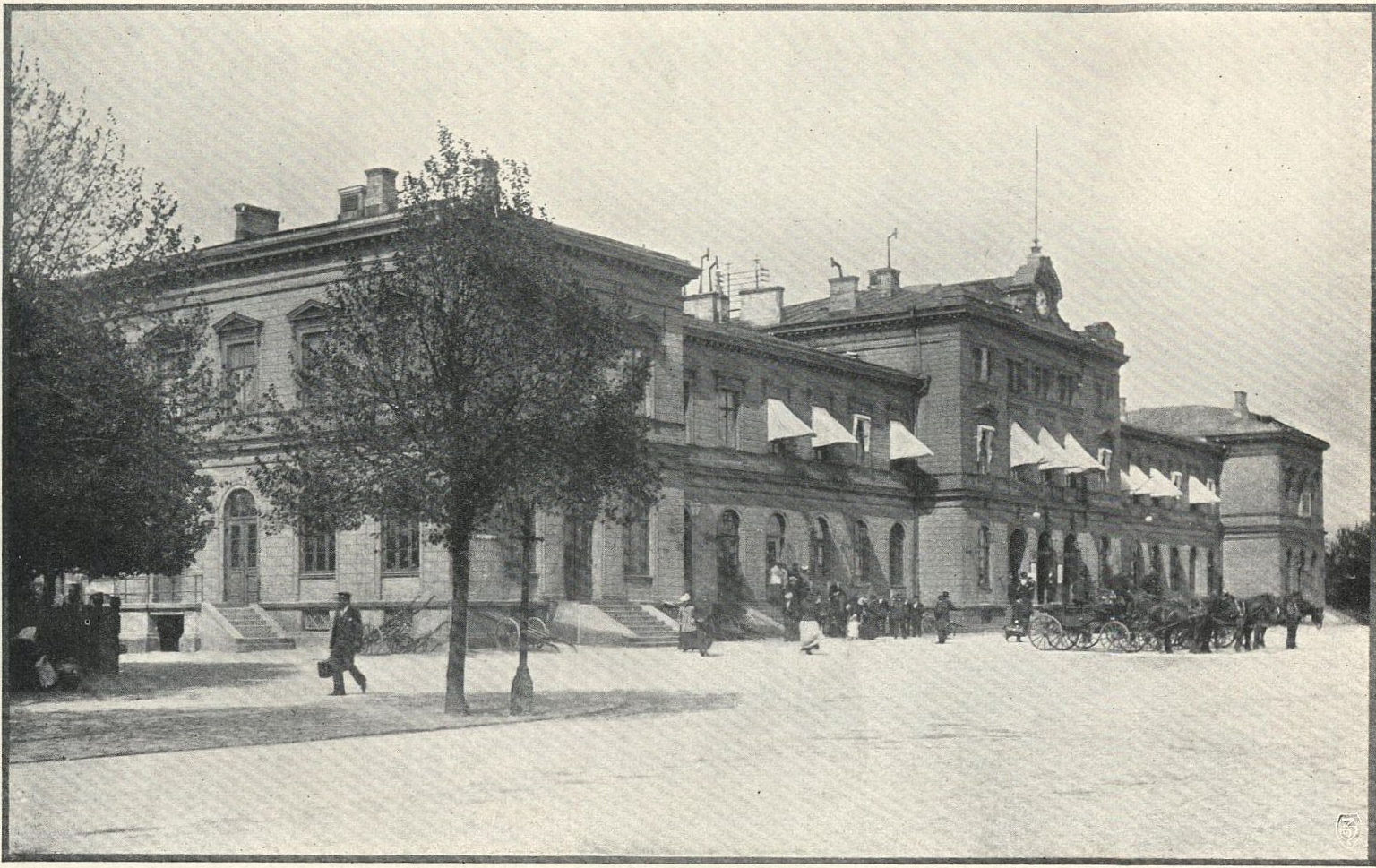
View of the station, circa 1904.

Bergslagsbanans station is an historic railway station in Gothenburg, Sweden. It is designated under number 21300000027694 by the Swedish National Heritage Board.

It was designed by brothers Axel Kumlien and Hjalmar Kumlien in 1881 for the Bergslagernas Järnvägar (Bergslagen Railway, BJ). The crest of the BJ can be seen above the right entrance of the station; it symbolizes ironwork and was the trademark of the railway company.
