= Falköping Municipality =

Falköping Municipality Falköpings kommun
- Municipality
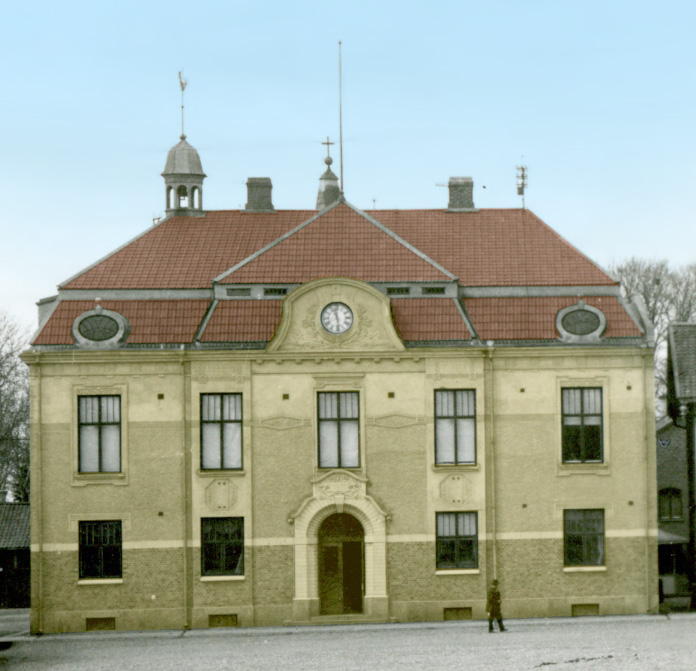
- Falköping Town Hall

- Coat of arms

- Coordinates: 58°10′N 13°33′E
- Country: Sweden
- County: Västra Götaland County
- Seat: Falköping

Area
  - Total: 1,065.78 km^{2} (411.50 sq mi)
  - Land: 1,044.98 km^{2} (403.47 sq mi)
  - Water: 20.8 km^{2} (8.0 sq mi)
- Area as of 1 January 2014.

Population (30 June 2025)
  - Total: 32,768
  - Density: 31.358/km^{2} (81.216/sq mi)
- Time zone: UTC+1 (CET)
  - Summer (DST): UTC+2 (CEST)
- ISO 3166 code: SE
- Province: Västergötland
- Municipal code: 1499
- Website: www.falkoping.se
- Density is calculated using land area only.

Falköping Municipality (Swedish: Falköpings kommun) is a municipality in Västra Götaland County in western Sweden. Its seat is located in the town of Falköping.

The present municipality consists of more than 50 original local government units, joined in two structural reforms carried out in 1952, when the number was reduced to eight, and during the period 1971–1974. In 1971 the former Town of Falköping was made a unitary municipality and three years later amalgamated with the surrounding municipalities.

== Localities ==
The population centres in the municipality include:

- Åsarp
- Åsle
- Falköping (seat)
- Floby
- Gudhem
- Gökhem
- Kinnarp
- Kättilstorp
- Luttra
- Odensberg
- Stenstorp
- Torbjörntorp
- Vartofta

== Demographics ==
This is a demographic table based on Falköping Municipality's electoral districts in the 2022 Swedish general election sourced from SVT's election platform, in turn taken from SCB official statistics.

In total there were 33,225 residents, including 24,879 Swedish citizens of voting age. 45.2% voted for the left coalition and 53.2% for the right coalition. Indicators are in percentage points except population totals and income.

| Location | Residents | Citizen adults | Left vote | Right vote | Employed | Swedish parents | Foreign heritage | Income SEK | Degree |
| Location | | | % | % | | | | | |
|---|---|---|---|---|---|---|---|---|---|
| Bergsliden | 1,636 | 1,157 | 48.1 | 49.4 | 73 | 69 | 31 | 21,435 | 33 |
| Bestorp-Mösseberg | 1,789 | 1,378 | 48.2 | 50.8 | 88 | 92 | 8 | 30,478 | 49 |
| Centrum | 2,667 | 2,080 | 46.8 | 51.9 | 82 | 82 | 18 | 25,939 | 34 |
| Dotorp-Tåstorp | 2,802 | 1,795 | 60.5 | 38.5 | 67 | 54 | 46 | 20,234 | 31 |
| Floby | 1,492 | 1,124 | 39.2 | 59.4 | 71 | 84 | 16 | 21,062 | 20 |
| Fredriksberg | 1,763 | 1,310 | 53.7 | 44.2 | 69 | 62 | 38 | 22,295 | 33 |
| Gudhem-Broddetorp | 1,933 | 1,462 | 42.0 | 56.5 | 87 | 93 | 7 | 27,246 | 36 |
| Kinnarp-Slutarp | 1,557 | 1,170 | 34.9 | 63.4 | 89 | 91 | 9 | 24,869 | 25 |
| Kyrkerör | 2,326 | 1,825 | 48.8 | 49.0 | 75 | 75 | 25 | 22,283 | 31 |
| Odensberg | 1,143 | 878 | 40.6 | 59.1 | 89 | 96 | 4 | 27,002 | 30 |
| Ranten-Grönelund | 1,793 | 1,276 | 53.2 | 43.5 | 67 | 56 | 44 | 19,809 | 27 |
| Stenstorp | 2,056 | 1,553 | 41.9 | 56.0 | 80 | 84 | 16 | 24,791 | 35 |
| Stenstorpsbygden | 1,385 | 1,102 | 39.1 | 60.2 | 89 | 94 | 6 | 27,814 | 34 |
| S Bestorp-Ne Mösseberg | 2,177 | 1,653 | 46.1 | 53.2 | 82 | 90 | 10 | 27,532 | 43 |
| Vartofta | 1,732 | 1,330 | 35.9 | 62.9 | 86 | 94 | 6 | 25,979 | 30 |
| Vilhelmsberg-Åttagård | 1,752 | 1,259 | 56.4 | 41.8 | 75 | 61 | 39 | 23,104 | 29 |
| Vilske | 1,361 | 1,080 | 36.1 | 62.5 | 84 | 93 | 7 | 25,200 | 26 |
| Åsarp-Kättilstorp | 1,861 | 1,447 | 34.0 | 63.7 | 83 | 91 | 9 | 24,621 | 28 |
Source: SVT
