= Västgötabergen =

Swedish chain of table mountains

Coordinates: 58°36′44″N 13°23′31″E

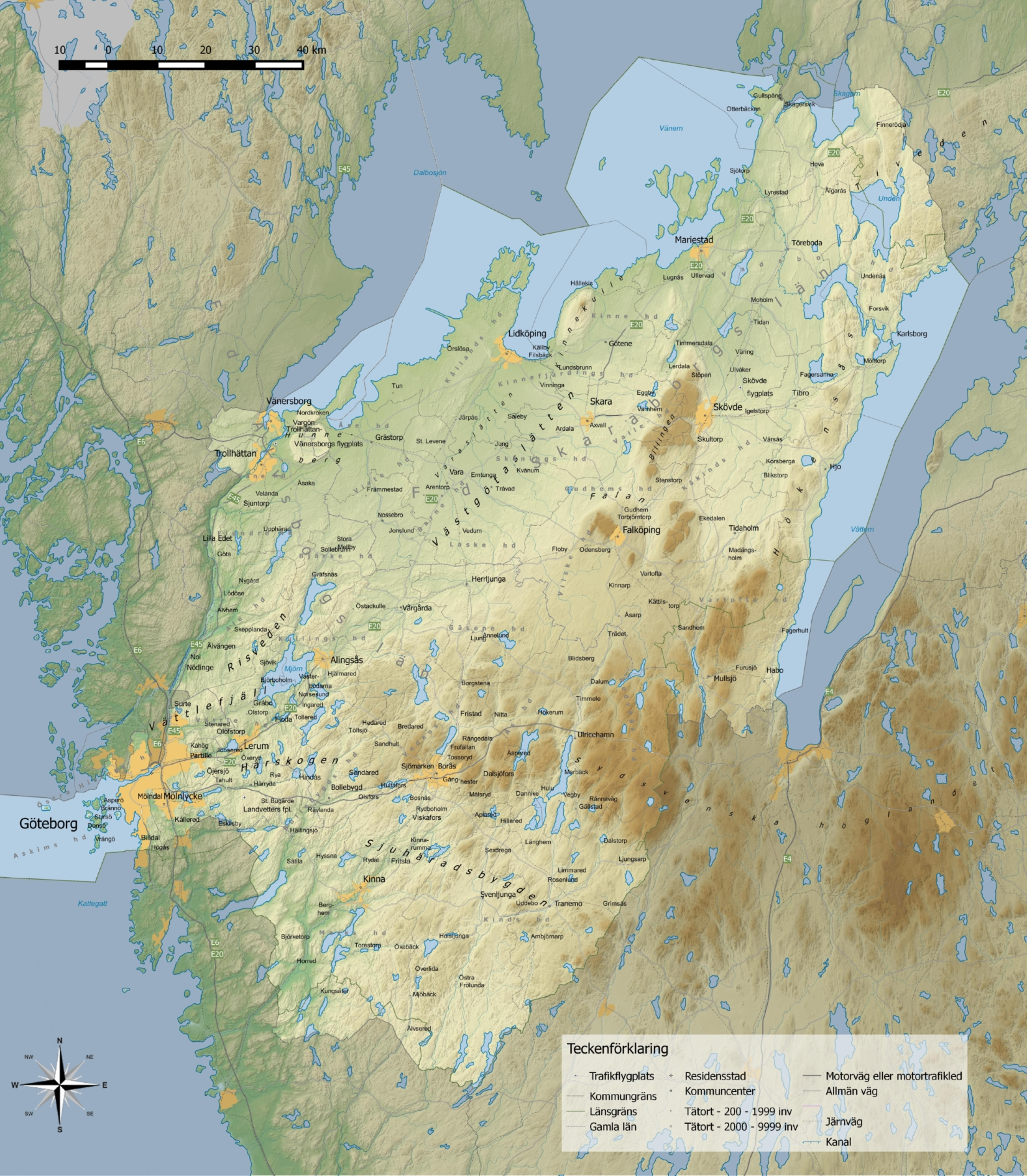
Västergötland and Falbygden (red circle)

Västgötabergen is the Swedish name for a range of 13 to 17 stratified mesas surrounding the Västgöta Plain (Swedish: Västgötaslätten). The plain, roughly corresponding to the northern part of the historic province of Västergötland, comprises multiple distinct plateaus, extending between Lake Vänern in the northwest, Lake Vättern in the northeast, and the South Swedish Highlands in the south.

The highest peaks are located in Falbygden, a historic cultural region in western Sweden, sometimes known as "Falan" due to its high plateau between the cities of Skövde and Falköping. The highest point is Ålleberg near Falköping, at 330 metres above sea level. Geologically, the region forms part of the Central Swedish Depression.

== Origin ==
The Västgötabergen consists of sedimentary rocks deposited during the Precambrian, Cambrian, Ordovician, and Silurian periods, spanning approximately 500 million years.

570–430 million years ago: The base of present-day Västergötland lay below sea level, with sediments deposited atop the bedrock. In the Permian, 270 million years ago, magma intruded and solidified into a hard diabase cap.

In the Permian period, magma penetrated cracks, forming a diabase cap over the sediments.

During the Caledonian Orogeny at the end of the Silurian, the region rose above sea level, with layers beneath the diabase cap protected from erosion. Where magma contact, up to 25 metres deep, thermally hardened the rock, it became particularly resistant. Surrounding softer rock eroded, leaving the mountains stepped shape. Their summit plateaus rise approximately 100 metres above the Västgöta Plain.

To geologists, the Table Mountains structure serves as a natural geological record of the past 500 million years. Kinnekulle clearly illustrates the sequence of layers. The layers include:

=== Basement ===
Sedimentary layers of the Västgötabergen in Falbygden. The diabase cap protected underlying rocks from erosion, shaping the mountain plateaus.

In Falbygden, around Kinnekulle and Billingen, bedrock formed 1,700–1,670 Ma ago, comprising granite and tonalite, often banded together.

Around Halleberg and Hunneberg, bedrock formed approximately 100 million years earlier, around 1,600–1,560 Ma, consisting of granite gneiss and tonalite, often exposed in banded formations.

At that time, Västergötland lay within the proposed supercontinent Columbia, deep below sea level at the foot of a mountain range. Life was limited to simple bacteria and single-celled organisms.

During the Cryogenian, 850–635 Ma, multiple global ice ages caused near-global glaciation. Glacial activity eroded the bedrock, forming a peneplain landscape.

Around 543 Ma, intense volcanic activity increased atmospheric carbon dioxide, triggering a greenhouse effect that ended the ice ages, marking the Cambrian explosion. Life evolved from simple forms to animals with limbs and sexual reproduction.

=== Sandstone ===
Around 530 Ma, towards the end of the Precambrian, Västergötland lay within the continent of Baltica. In the present-day Västgötabergen region, a shallow sea covered the bedrock, depositing eroded rock material as sand layers in the Cambrian, solidifying into sandstone. This layer, averaging over 25 metres in thickness, contains fossils of cephalopods, archaeocyatha, brachiopods, trilobites, graptolites, corals, and crustacean ostracodes. In the uppermost layers, the first nautiloids, a cephalopod family surviving today, are found.

=== Alum slate ===
During the Middle Cambrian and early Ordovician, 515–485 Ma, rising sea levels, driven by warming temperatures that melted polar ice caps, initiated a self-reinforcing cycle. Due to warming, biomass increased. However, as Cambrian flora and fauna were ocean-limited, oxygen levels in the oceans decreased. Organic material decomposed incompletely after sinking to the seafloor, and through carbonisation, sapropel formed, transforming into a bituminous alum slate layer, averaging 25 metres thick.

In the seafloor mud, anaerobic bacteria, thriving without oxygen, converted sulphate to hydrogen sulfide via sulfate reduction. This process precipitated heavy metals from seawater as sulphides, e.g., pyrite (FeS₂) and uranium sulphide, storing them in the sediment.

This explains the alum slate's oil shale and uranium content in Västergötland. Historically, it was mined as fuel for lime burning at local limestone quarries. Today, it is mined for uranium, used in nuclear reactors. Ranstad, south of Billingen, hosts Sweden's largest uranium deposit, containing 254,000 tonnes.

Alum slate contains deposits of anthraconite, a coal-blackened calcareous spar, locally termed orsten or stinkstone due to its unpleasant odour during processing.

The sedimentary rock is rich in fossils, including microscopic single-celled algae and acritarchs, which dominated Cambrian marine life. Land plants had not yet evolved.

=== Limestone ===
During the Middle Cambrian and Ordovician, 513–470 Ma, a deeper sea in Västergötland, dominated by marine creatures, facilitated the formation of skeletal structures using dissolved calcite with minimal energy. Notably, coccolithophores and foraminifera contributed to the limestone layer, sequestering most atmospheric carbon dioxide emitted by volcanoes in the early Cambrian. Concurrently, rising atmospheric oxygen enabled modern aerobic life forms. After death, these organisms sank, forming coccolithic mud, which solidified through diagenesis. Thus, limestone carbon remained chemically bound.

In addition to microorganisms, nearly indistinguishable from microscopic calcite grains, the rock layer contains shell remains of trilobites, echinoderms, and orthocerid cephalopods (Orthocerida). These rock-forming layers support only thin, less fertile soils, making Falbygden limestone areas better suited for grazing than agricultural cultivation.

=== Shale clay ===
During the Late Cambrian and Early Silurian, 500–430 Ma, weathered continental material was deposited as fine mud in deeper marine zones of Västergötland. This mud, formed primarily through chemical decomposition of feldspar, quartz, and mica, included clay minerals like kaolinite, plus organic and bituminous components. This mud was sedimented into shale clay. Despite its name, it is not a true schist, lacking schistosity due to the absence of metamorphic recrystallisation.

Only under high pressure in deeper crustal layers would it transform into metamorphic clay schist, destroying fossils. However, the mud solidified through diagenesis without mineral transformation, preserving brachiopods, trilobites, and marine organisms as fossils, thus termed an "undeformed slate." Mica imparts a faintly schistose, layered structure to the sediment.

Known as "Lerskiffer" (clay slate) in Swedish, this rock differs from the German "Schiefer," used for roofing tiles and panels. Shale clay is too soft for such uses. As it erodes, it enhances the fertile clay soils of the Vara Plain.

=== Diabase ===
Towards the end of the Permian, 300–270 Ma, the collision of Earth's continents formed the supercontinent Pangaea, marking a geologically significant period. Characterised by events not necessarily directly related, their temporal coincidence suggests a causal link. At the Permian–Triassic boundary, 90% of Earth's species became extinct. Concurrently, massive volcanic eruptions produced basaltic lava, covering vast areas of ancient Siberia and forming the two-million-square-kilometre Siberian Traps.

In the Västgötabergen region of Västergötland, surface rocks fractured, allowing magma to rise along fault lines. In Falbygden, around Billingen and Kinnekulle, magma intruded into Silurian cracks, solidifying as flood basalt and forming a laccolith, which protected underlying layers from erosion.

Conversely, on Halleberg and Hunneberg, magma penetrated only Cambrian and Ordovician layers, forming a sill. Without a diabase cover, the overlying limestone and slate eroded, leaving these mountains lower than other Västgötabergen peaks. The diabase layer averages 60 metres thick on Halleberg and Hunneberg.

== Schematic representation of the layers ==
Rock layers in profile and plan view (1)

(1) = Kinnekulle only)
