= Central Swedish lowland =

Region in Sweden

Coordinates: 59°N 15°E

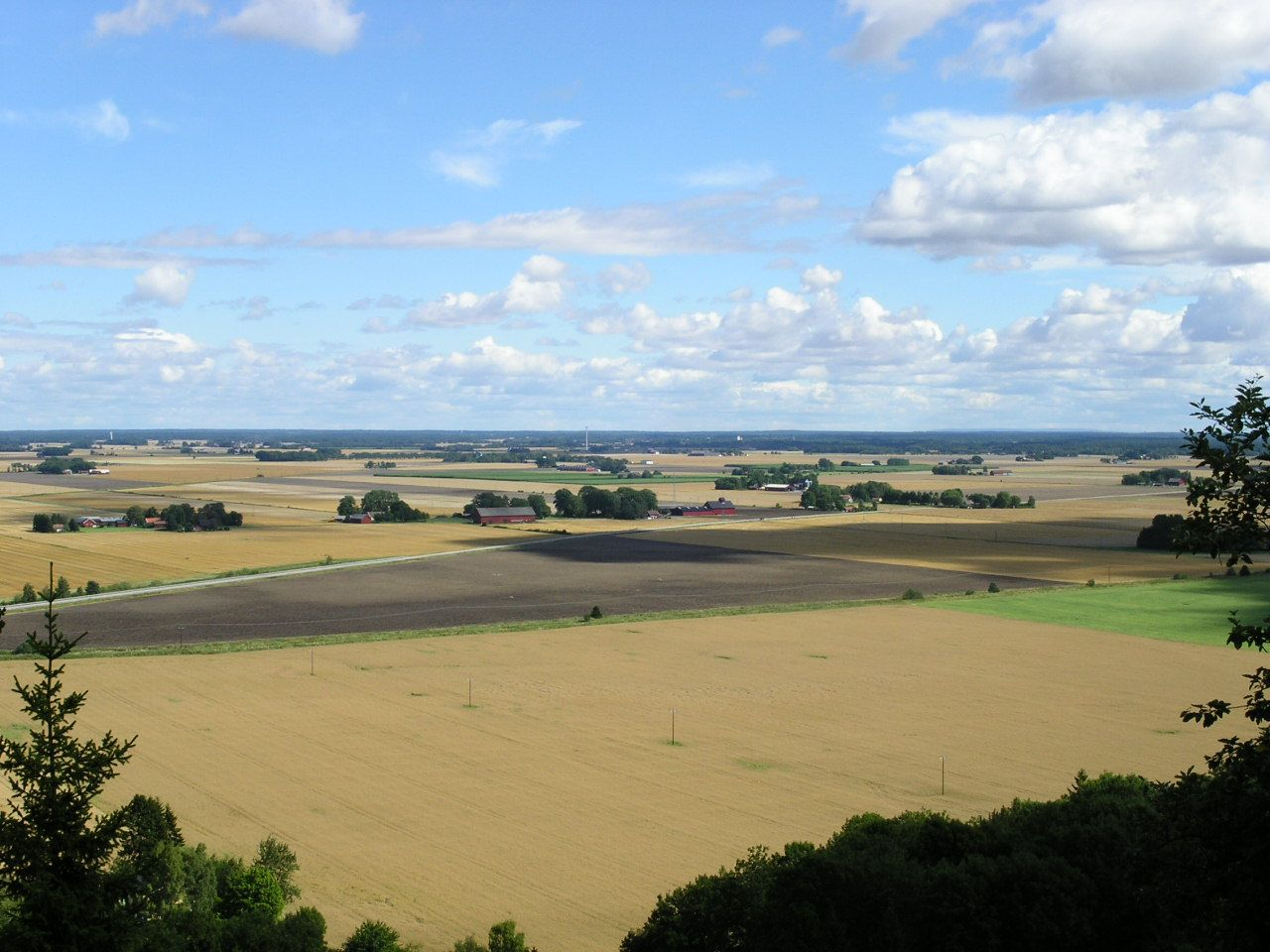
Summertime agricultural landscape around Flo, south of Vänern.

The Central Swedish lowland (Swedish: Mellansvenska sänkan, Mellansvenska låglandet) is a large region of low relief and altitude in Sweden spanning from the Swedish West Coast at Bohuslän to the Stockholm archipelago and Roslagen at the Baltic Sea. The Central Swedish lowland forms a broad east-west trending belt north of the South Swedish highlands and south of the Norrland terrain. Traditionally the heartland of Sweden due to its large population and agricultural resources, the region benefits additionally from the proximity of hydropower, forest and mineral resources. The lowlands are furthermore well-positioned for trade across the Baltic region. (Note: However in the 20th century most of Sweden's foreign trade went through the North Sea with the consequence that Gothenburg at the western end of the lowlands has overtaken Stockholm as the chief port of Sweden.) These advantages are reflected in the location of Sweden's capital, Stockholm, at the eastern end of the lowlands. Most of Sweden's manufacturing industries lie in this region.

== Relief, soil and vegetation ==
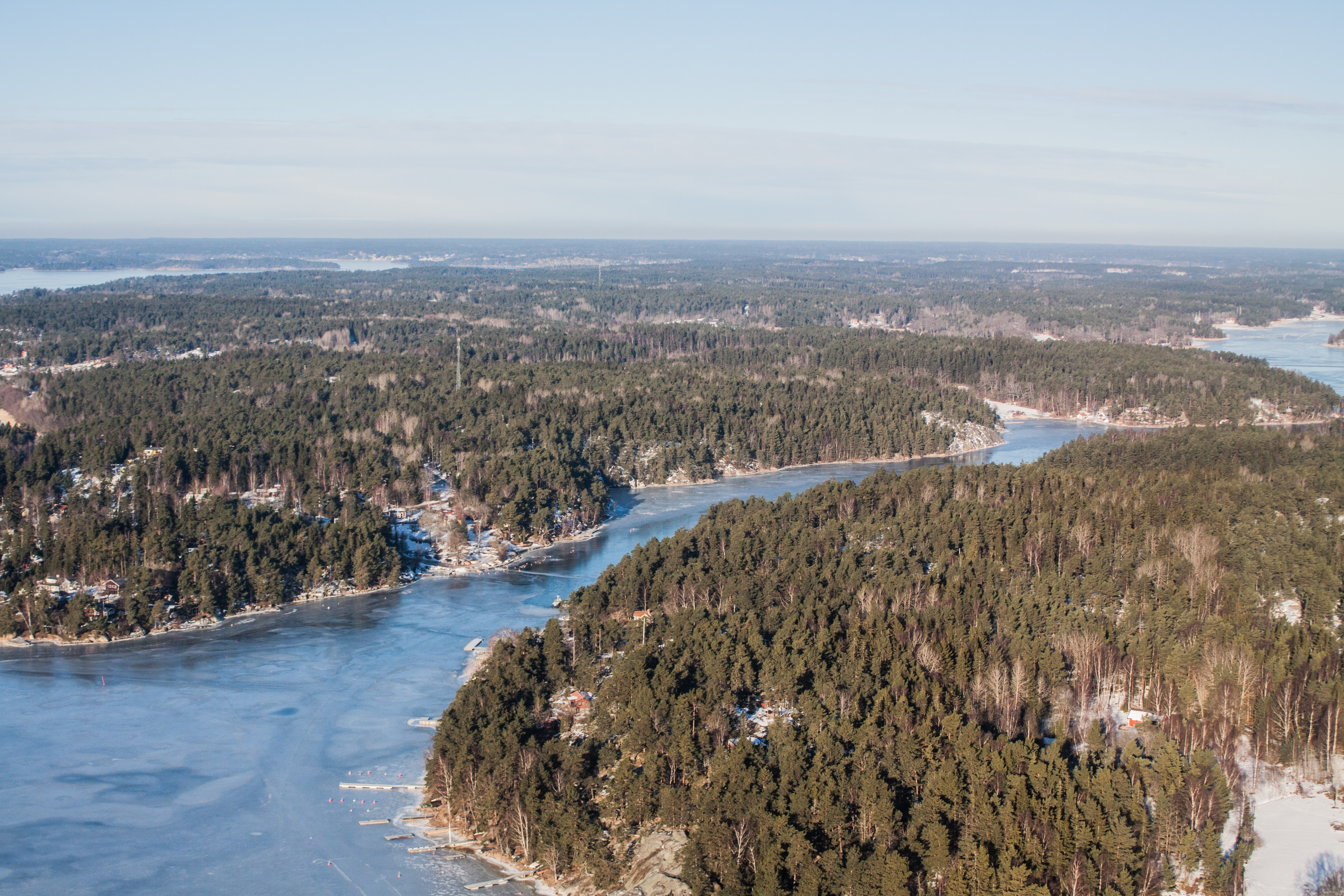
Joint valley landscape seen in wintertime Stockholm archipelago.

The reason on how the lowlands reached its sunken position relative to other parts of Sweden is not clear. Possibly its boundaries are flexures in Earth's crust rather, the possibility of geological faults forming its boundaries is ruled out as none of them have been found. Much of the Sub-Cambrian peneplain, that is otherways common in eastern Sweden, is preserved on the Central Swedish lowland. The relief of the region is contain various areas of joint valley terrain (Swedish: Sprickdalsterräng), this means that the landscape is dissected by valleys following joints, faults and other weakness zones in the Precambrian shield rocks. NNW-SSE trending eskers, that are usually forested, crosses the lowlands. In Västergötland the lowland contain a series of hills made up Silurian-aged sedimentary rock, these are; Kinnekulle, Halleberg, Hunneberg and Billingen.

The region forms a belt of fertile soils suitable for agriculture that interrupts the forested and till-coated lands to the north and south. The soil types of the Central Swedish lowland include fine grained sediments, like clays, as patent materials. This is because the whole region is below the highest coastline (Swedish: Högsta kustlinjen) since deglaciation, allowing for marine and lacustrine sedimentation before post-glacial rebound bought the lowland above sea level. Before the expansion of agriculture fertile soils were occupied by contiguous broad-leaved tree forest where maples, oaks, ashes, small-leaved lime and common hazel grew. The Central Swedish lowland does however also contain soils of poor quality, particularly in hills where Scots pine and Norway spruce grows on top of thin till soils.

== Hydrography ==
Sweden's four largest lakes, Vänern, Vättern, Mälaren and Hjälmaren, all lie within the lowlands. The Central Swedish lowland is one of Sweden's ten groundwater regions. (Note: The groundwater region definition of the Central Swedish lowland excludes Uppland, the west coast and any parts underlain by sedimentary rock (e.g. Kinnekulle).) The groundwater of the coast of the Central Swedish lowlands have high amounts of chloride as result of the presence of fossil sea water. The soils developed on fine-grained sediments are better buffers against groundwater acidification than tills found elsewhere in Sweden.

== See also ==
- Central Swedish ice-edge zone
