= Central Swedish ice-edge zone =

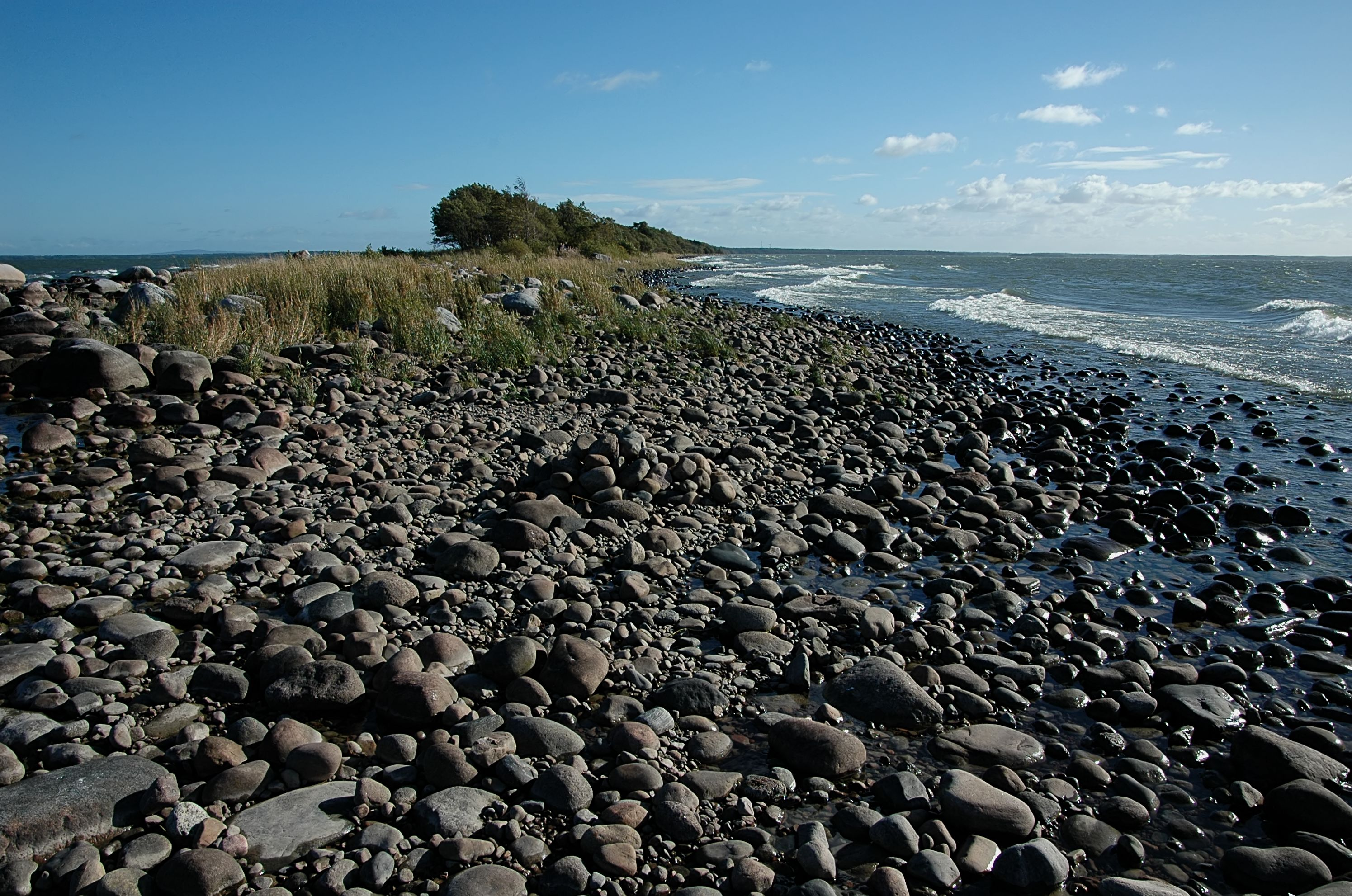
Hindens rev

The central Swedish ice-edge zone was formed when the melting of inland ice slowed during a cold period approximately 12,000 years ago and the ice edge stood relatively still for around 800 years. This occurred during the Younger Dryas period. The two main terminal moraines of this zone are the Skövde and Billigen ones. These two terminal moraines form parallel and semicontinuous ridges spanning from the Västgöta plains though the Östgöta plains to the Stockholm archipelago.

== See also ==
- Central Swedish lowland
