= M74 =

M74 or M-74 may refer to:

- M74 light mortar
- M74 motorway, a motorway in Scotland
- Messier 74, a spiral galaxy in the constellation Pisces
- M74 rocket, an incendiary rocket for a shoulder-fired M202A1 FLASH launcher
- M74 armored recovery vehicle, a variant of the M4 Sherman tank
- M-74 (Michigan highway), a former state highway in Michigan
- M74 (or Mk 74), a submunition (bomblet) used with American ATACMS missiles
- M74 syndrome, a disease prevalent in Baltic salmon
