= Nordkroken =

- Location within Västra Götaland Location within Sweden
- Coordinates: 58°23′N 12°24′E
- Country: Sweden
- Province: Västergötland
- County: Västra Götaland County
- Municipality: Vänersborg Municipality

Area
  - Total: 0.40 km^{2} (0.15 sq mi)

Population (31 December 2010)
  - Total: 423
  - Density: 1,059/km^{2} (2,740/sq mi)
- Time zone: UTC+1 (CET)
  - Summer (DST): UTC+2 (CEST)

Nordkroken is a locality situated in Vänersborg Municipality, Västra Götaland County, Sweden with 423 inhabitants in 2010.
