= Vargön =

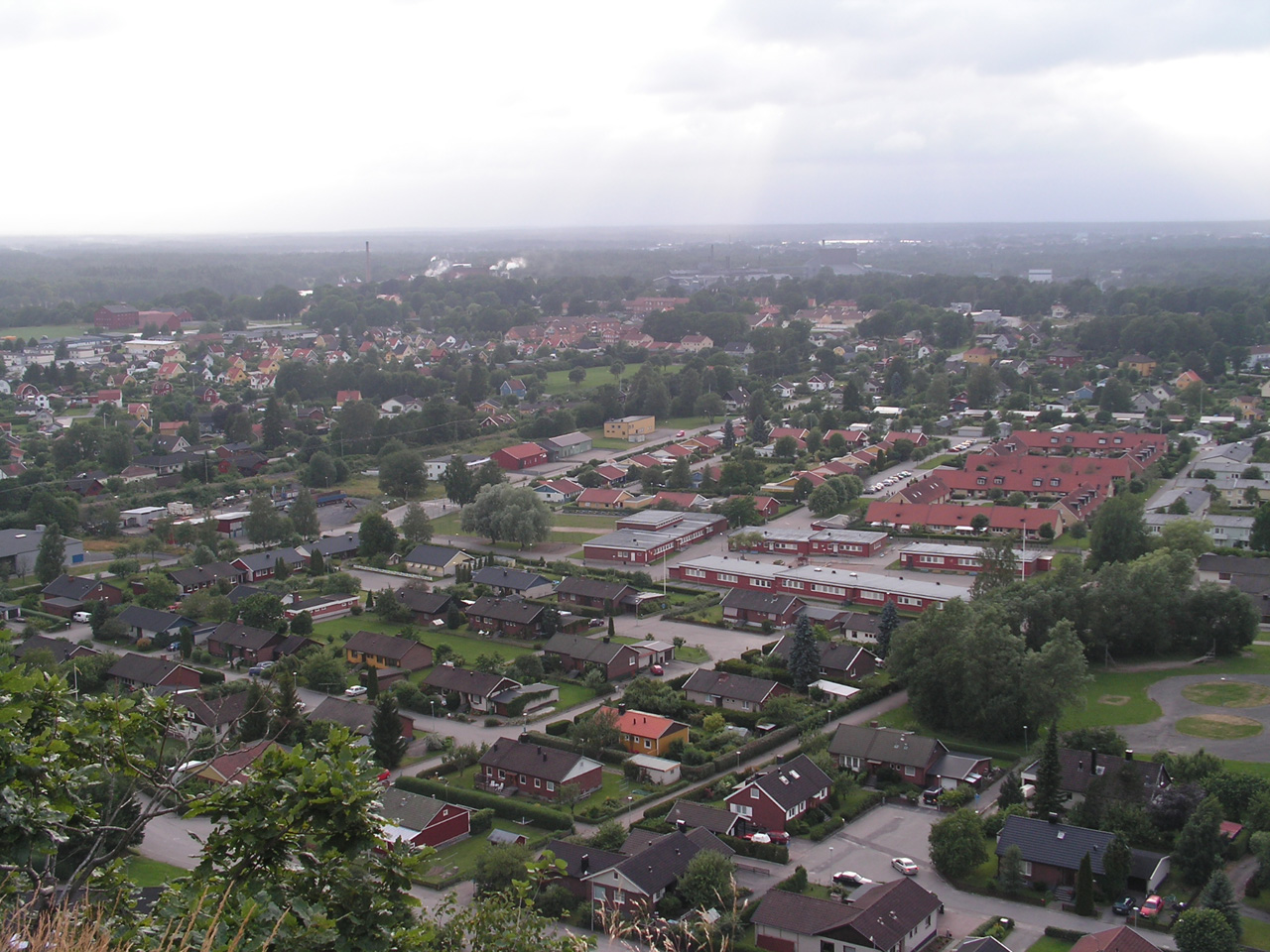
- Vargön as seen from the Halleberg hill in 2005

- Location within Västra Götaland Location within Sweden
- Coordinates: 58°21′N 12°24′E
- Country: Sweden
- Province: Västergötland
- County: Västra Götaland County
- Municipality: Vänersborg Municipality

Area
  - Total: 3.51 km^{2} (1.36 sq mi)

Population (31 December 2010)
  - Total: 4,919
  - Density: 1,401/km^{2} (3,630/sq mi)
- Time zone: UTC+1 (CET)
  - Summer (DST): UTC+2 (CEST)

Vargön is a locality situated in Vänersborg Municipality, Västra Götaland County, Sweden with 4,919 inhabitants in 2010. Vargön is noted for Vargön Alloys, a producer of iron alloys.
