= Salpausselkä =

Extensive ridge system in Southern Finland

Salpausselkä ridge system

Animation about the formation of Salpauselkä

Salpausselkä (Finnish: [ˈsɑlpɑu̯sˌselkæ]; "Bar Ridge") is an extensive ridge system left by the ice age in Southern Finland. It is a large terminal moraine formation that formed in front of the Baltic ice lake during the Younger Dryas period about 12,250–10,400 years ago. All together the formation is close to 500 km (310 mi) from end to end, and the ridges can be as tall as 80 m (260 ft) in some places.

It runs from Hanko hundreds of kilometers to the east. It traps the extensive river and lake systems of Central Finland known as Finnish Lakeland (Finnish: Järvi-Suomi, "Lake Finland") and forces the water to flow through few breaches in the ridge. The Vuoksi River flows from lake Saimaa into Lake Ladoga (Finnish: Laatokka) in Russia. From there the water subsequently flows through river Neva into the Gulf of Finland, bypassing the Salpausselkä. The Kymi River flows from Päijänne into the Gulf of Finland. An artificial breach from the Lakeland is the Saimaa Canal, from Saimaa at Lappeenranta into the Gulf of Finland at Vyborg.

Salpausselkä has been used for transportation because of the easy terrain for centuries; later on both railways and highways have been built to follow it. It is also an important source of clean groundwater filtering from the lakes on the upper side (north) of the ridge, for the communities built alongside the ridge. The south side of the Salpausselkä has been inhabited for more than 10,000 years.

There are also formations called Second and Third Salpausselkä, which are similar in form but smaller. They are situated north of the main Salpausselkä, and were formed later respectively.

== See also ==
- Central Swedish ice-edge zone
