= Västergötland =

Historical province of Sweden

Coordinates: 57°43′41″N 12°42′00″E

- Historical province
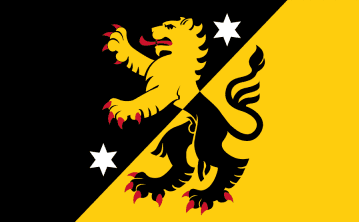
- Flag Coat of arms

- Country: Sweden
- Land: Götaland
- Counties: Västra Götaland County; Jönköping County; Halland County; Örebro County

Area
  - Total: 16,694 km^{2} (6,446 sq mi)

Population (31 December 2023)
  - Total: 1,410,554
  - Density: 84.495/km^{2} (218.84/sq mi)

Ethnicity
  - Language: Swedish
  - Dialect: Västgötska, Gothenburg dialect

Culture
  - Flower: Heather
  - Animal: Crane
  - Bird: —
  - Fish: Burbot
- Time zone: UTC+1 (CET)
  - Summer (DST): UTC+2 (CEST)

Västergötland (Swedish: [ˈvɛ̂sːtɛrˌjøːtland]), also known in older literature as West Gothland or the Latinized version Westrogothia, is one of the 25 traditional non-administrative provinces of Sweden (landskap in Swedish), situated in the southwest of Sweden.

Västergötland is home to Gothenburg, the second largest city in Sweden, which is situated along a short stretch of the Kattegat strait. The province is bordered by Bohuslän, Dalsland, Värmland, Närke, Östergötland, Småland and Halland, as well as the two largest Swedish lakes Vänern and Vättern. Victoria, Crown Princess of Sweden is Duchess of Västergötland.

== Administration ==
The provinces of Sweden serve no administrative function. Instead, that function is served by counties of Sweden. From the 17th century up until 31 December 1997, Västergötland was divided into Skaraborg County, Älvsborg County and a minor part of Gothenburg and Bohus County. From 1 January 1998 nearly all of the province is in the newly created Västra Götaland County, with the exception of Habo Municipality and Mullsjö Municipality, which were transferred to Jönköping County, and smaller parts of the province which are in Halland County and Örebro County.

== Heraldry ==
Västergötland was granted its arms at the time of the funeral of King Gustav Vasa in 1560. The province is also a duchy and the arms can be represented with the ducal coronet. Blazon: "Per bend sinister Sable and Or, a Lion rampant counterchanged langued and armed Gules between two Mullets Argent in the Sable field."

== Geography ==
The southern and eastern part of the province is dominated by hills, belonging to the southern Swedish highlands. In geological terms southern Västergötland is made up of northward tilted surfaces of the Sub-Cambrian peneplain making up the flank of the Southern Swedish Dome.

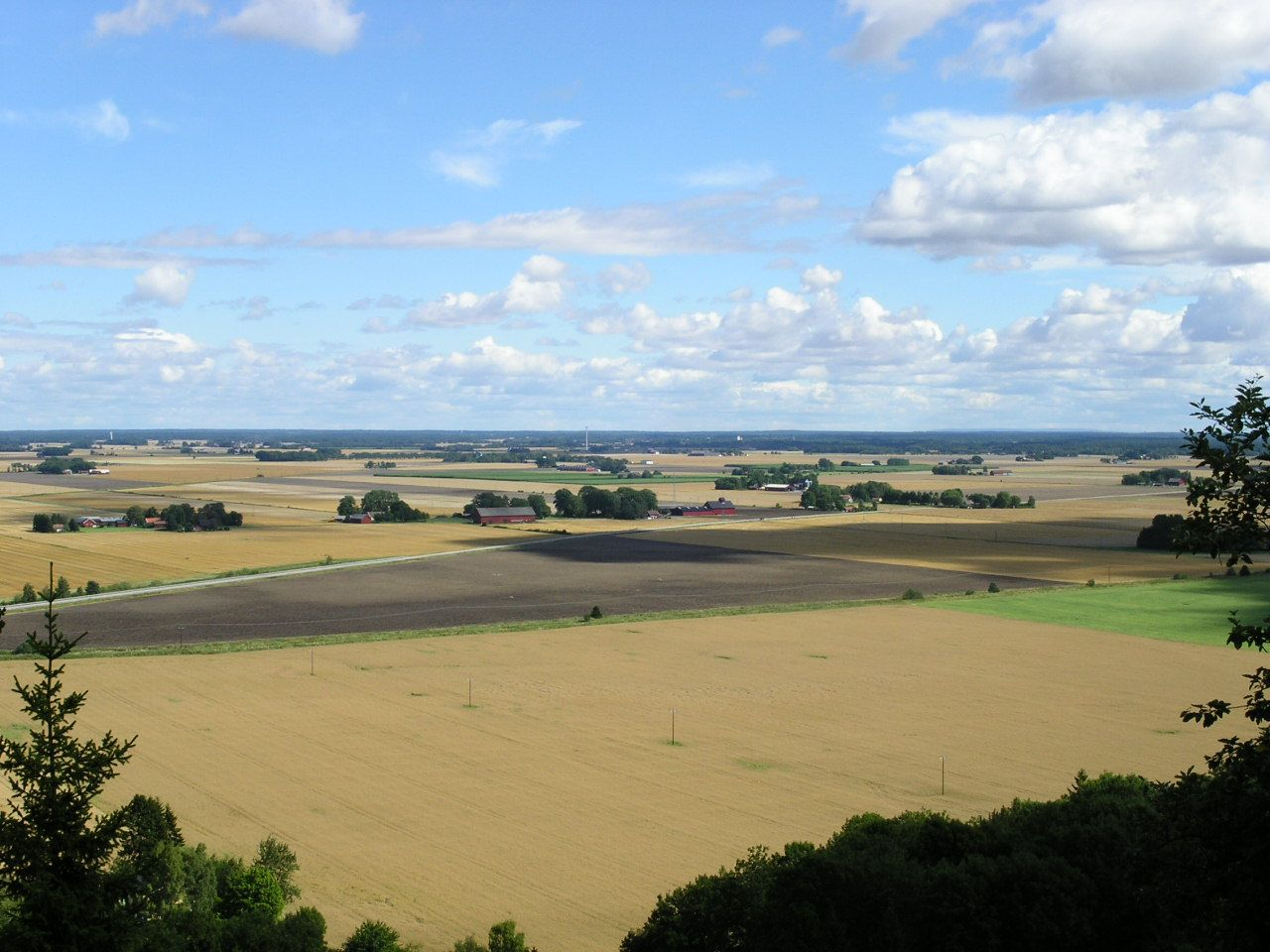
Summertime agricultural landscape around Flo, south of Vänern. These plains are part of the geographical Central Swedish lowland and the geological Sub-Cambrian peneplain.

The northern and western portions of the province belong to the Central Swedish lowland, which in this part is referred to as the Västgöta-plains or Västgötaslätten. Characteristic for these lowlands in Västergötland is that they contain hills made up Silurian-aged sedimentary rock. These are; Kinnekulle, Halleberg, Hunneberg and Billingen.

Along the Kattegat lies the archipelago usually known as the Gothenburg archipelago. The southern part of it, belonging to Gothenburg Municipality, is part of Västergötland.

The northwestern border is demarcated by Sweden's largest lake Vänern, and the north-eastern border is demarcated by Sweden's second largest lake Vättern. Within the province the shoreline of Lake Vänern is 330 kilometres (210 mi) long, and along Vättern it is 130 km (81 mi). The largest river is Göta älv which drains Vänern to the east shore and the Kattegat strait; along the river several important cities and towns have been situated for centuries.

The average rainfall is 900 mm (35 in) near the coast and 600 mm (24 in) in the plains. The average temperature is −1 °C (30 °F) in January and 15 °C (59 °F) in July.

- Highest mountain: Galtåsen 362 meters (1188')
- National parks: Tiveden, Djurö

== Population ==
As of 31 December 2016, Västergötland had a population of 1,328,128 distributed over four counties:

| County | Population |
|---|---|
| part of Västra Götaland County | 1,305,659 |
| part of Jönköping County | 18,812 |
| part of Halland County | 2,126 |
| part of Örebro County | 1,531 |

== History ==
=== Prehistory and middle ages ===
There are many ancient remains in Västergötland. Among the most notable of these remains are the dolmens from the Funnelbeaker culture, in the Falköping area south of lake Vänern. Finnestorp, near Larv, was a weapons sacrificial site from the Iron Age.

The population of Västergötland, the Geats, appear in the writings of the Greek Ptolemaios (as Goutai), and they appear as Gautigoths in Jordanes' work in the 6th century. The province of Västergötland represented the heartland of Götaland, once an independent petty kingdom with a long line of Geatish kings. These are mainly described in foreign sources (Frankish) and through legends. It is possible that Västergötland had the same king as the rest of Sweden at the time of the monk Ansgar's mission to Sweden in the 9th century, but both the date and nature of its inclusion into the Swedish kingdom is a matter of much debate. Some date it as early as the 6th century, based on the Swedish-Geatish wars in Beowulf epos; others date it as late as the 12th century.

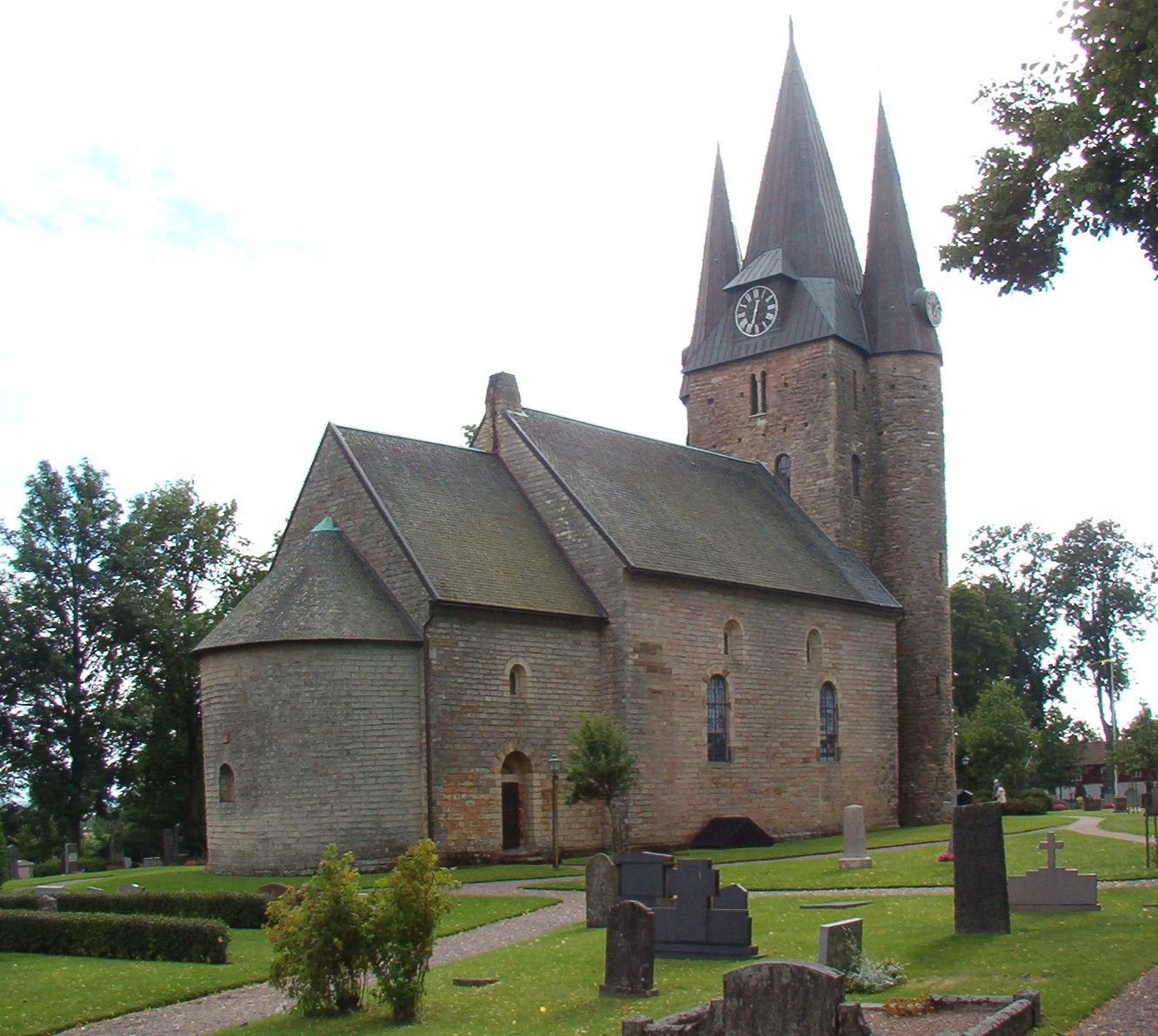
Husaby Church.

Västergötland received much early influence from the British Isles and is generally considered to be the bridgehead of Christianity's advance into Sweden. Recent excavations at Varnhem suggest that at least its central parts were Christian in the 9th century. Around 1000, King Olof Skötkonung is held to have received baptism in Husaby, near lake Vänern. However, the Christianization was met with heavy opposition in the rest of his kingdom, and so Olof had to restrict the Christian activities to Västergötland. The Christian faith spread, and by the time the provincial law Västgötalagen was written in the 13th century, Västergötland had 517 churches. The seat of the area's diocese seems to originally have been Husaby, but since 1150 the city of Skara (just some 20 kilometers; 10 miles south) held that distinction.

From the election of King Stenkil in the 11th century, Swedish and Geatish dynasties vied for the control of Sweden during long civil wars. For instance, the Swedish king Ragnvald Knaphövde was elected king by the Swedes, but when he entered Västergötland, he chose not to demand hostage from the powerful Geatish clans and was slain by the Geats near Falköping. Several times, Västergötland was independent from Sweden with kings such as Inge I of Sweden and Magnus the Strong. In later years the area was progressively tied more closely to the Swedish kingdom.

Being in peace with the rest of Sweden did not mean being in peace. Located along the borders of Denmark (with the so-called Scanian lands) and Norway (with Bohuslän), the area was often involved in armed disputes and invaded by hostile armies.

Some places and dates of early battles were the Battle of Älgarås (1205), the Battle of Lena (1208), the Battle of Hova (1275), the Battle of Gälakvist (1279) and the Battle of Falköping (1389). Thereafter, Sweden was involved in the Sweden-Danish wars; some notable years 1452, 1511, 1520, 1566, 1612, 1676.

In 1658, the current borders of Sweden were established when Sweden annexed both the Scanian lands and Bohuslän. Västergötland became less exposed as it was further from the country borders. Seaside battles at the end of Scanian War in the 1670s was the last combat on Västergötland soil.

Sources:

- Nordisk Familjebok (link below).

=== 16th century and after ===
In 1634, the province was modernized with the establishment of two counties: Skaraborg County (with Skara as capital) and Älvsborg County (Capital first in Gothenburg but after 1679 in Vänersborg).

Skaraborg county was named after a fortress (borg) outside the city of Skara. The seat of residence for the county governor was Mariestad from 1660 onwards and the largest city (during the 20th century) was first Lidköping and later Skövde. The county consisted of the northeastern part of the province of Västergötland.

Even though Skaraborg County itself no longer exists, various organizations are still named after it, and cover that approximate area. These include several newspapers, one public radio channel and various non-profit organizations. Also, the regional hospital complex in Skövde is named Skaraborgs sjukhus, as is the Skaraborg Wing (F 7) in Såtenäs and the Skaraborg Regiment (P 4) in Skövde.

Älvsborg county corresponded to the traditional province of Dalsland and was named after Älvsborg Castle, which is where the county administration was initially based. Älvsborg was demolished in the 1660s and the county seat moved to nearby Gothenburg, but the county continued to bear the name Älvsborg. Under the 1658 Treaty of Roskilde, the Norwegian province of Bohuslän was transferred to Sweden, and in 1680 it was decided to form a new county comprising Bohuslän, creating the new Gothenburg and Bohus County.

Gothenburg and Bohus was a county of Sweden until 1 January 1998, when it was merged with Skaraborg County and Älvsborg County to form Västra Götaland County.

The county was named after the city of Gothenburg and the historical province of Bohuslän. Gothenburg was the seat of residence for the governor and represented the westernmost part of the province of Västergötland.

== Culture ==
=== Language ===
In Västergötland, the Götamål dialect of Swedish is spoken. The dialect has several varieties like the ones spoken in Gothenburg and Sjuhärad, but the main dialectal variety is the Western Götaland dialect, Västgötska.

The dialect was first dealt with as early as 1772, by S. Hofs in his Dialectus vestrogothica, which was a vocabulary with a grammar introduction.

=== Sights ===
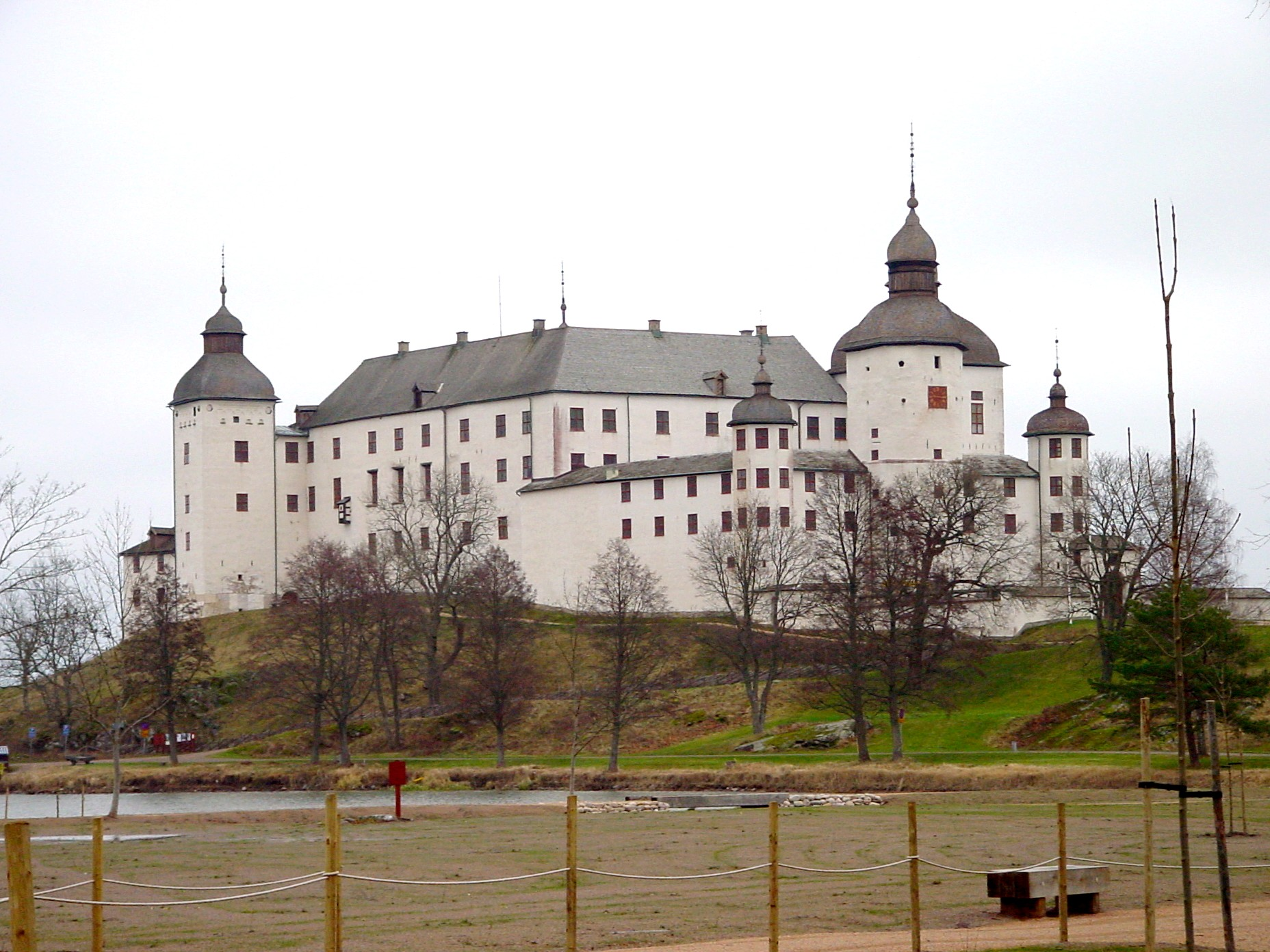
Läckö Castle.

Läckö Castle is situated on the island Kållandsö in the Vänern lake. It is generally regarded as one of Sweden's finest Baroque castles. The island was actually the location of a fortress as early as 1298, but the current building was begun in 1615, supervised first by Jacob De la Gardie and then finished by his son Magnus Gabriel de la Gardie.

Karlsborg Fortress, the largest fortress in Europe, is situated in the town of Karlsborg. It is a testament to the "Central Defence Principle" of the 19th century, a reaction to the loss of Finland as a buffer state in 1809.

Bjurum manor, one of the largest Swedish manors in the country, is located in Västergötland.

Skara Cathedral is the oldest cathedral in the original parts of Sweden, i.e. if Scania is not included.

== Hundreds ==
Hundreds of Sweden were sub-divisions of the Swedish provinces until the early 20th century. Several of Västergötland's hundreds were already described in the first written law for the province (Västgötalagen) in the 13th century. Västergötland's hundreds were:

- Ale
- Askim
- Barne
- Bjärke
- Bollebygd
- Eastern Hisingen
- Flundre
- Frökind
- Gudhem
- Gäsene
- Kåkind
- Kålland
- Kind
- Kinne
- Kinner Quarter
- Kulling
- Laske
- Mark
- Mo
- Redväg
- Skånings
- Vadsbo
- Valle
- Vartofta
- Veden
- Vilske
- Viste
- Väne
- Vätle
- Ås
- Åse

== Municipalities ==
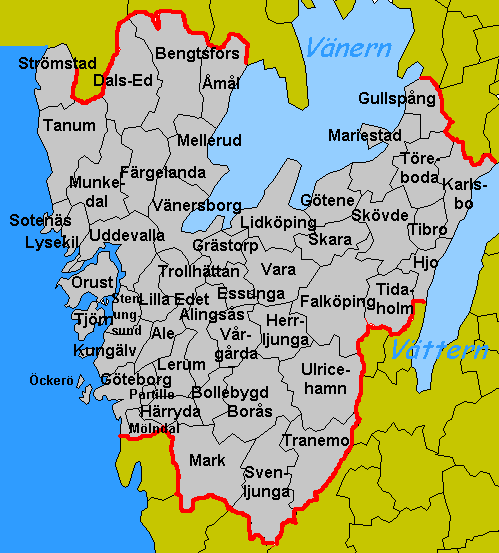
Map of Västra Götaland county

- Ale
- Alingsås
- Bengtsfors
- Bollebygd
- Borås
- Dals-Ed
- Essunga
- Falköping
- Färgelanda
- Grästorp
- Gullspång
- Götene
- Gothenburg
- Herrljunga
- Hjo
- Härryda
- Karlsborg
- Kungälv
- Lerum
- Lidköping
- Lilla Edet
- Lysekil
- Mariestad
- Mark
- Mellerud
- Munkedal
- Mölndal
- Orust
- Partille
- Skara
- Skövde
- Sotenäs
- Stenungsund
- Strömstad
- Svenljunga
- Tanum
- Tibro
- Tidaholm
- Tjörn
- Tranemo
- Trollhättan
- Töreboda
- Uddevalla
- Ulricehamn
- Vara
- Vårgårda
- Vänersborg
- Åmål
- Öckerö

== Cities ==
The cities of Sweden were formerly chartered entities with certain privileges. Today they are municipalities.

- Alingsås (1619)
- Borås (1621)
- Falköping (approximately 1200)
- Gothenburg/Göteborg (1621)
- Hjo (approximately 1400)
- Lidköping (1446)
- Mariestad (1583)
- Mölndal (1922)
- Skara (approximately 988)
- Skövde (approximately 1400)
- Tidaholm (1910)
- Trollhättan (1916)
- Ulricehamn (approximately 1400)
- Vänersborg (1644)

The largest city, Gothenburg, is located by the western shore with a significant harbour commerce.

== Sports ==
Football in the province is administered by Västergötlands Fotbollförbund.

== See also ==
- Göta Canal
- Västgötabergen
- Götaland theory

== Other sources ==
- Nordisk familjebok, Owl edition, volume 33, p. 373 (373–374 (Nordisk familjebok / Uggleupplagan. 33. Väderlek – Äänekoski)).
