= Byälven =

River in Sweden

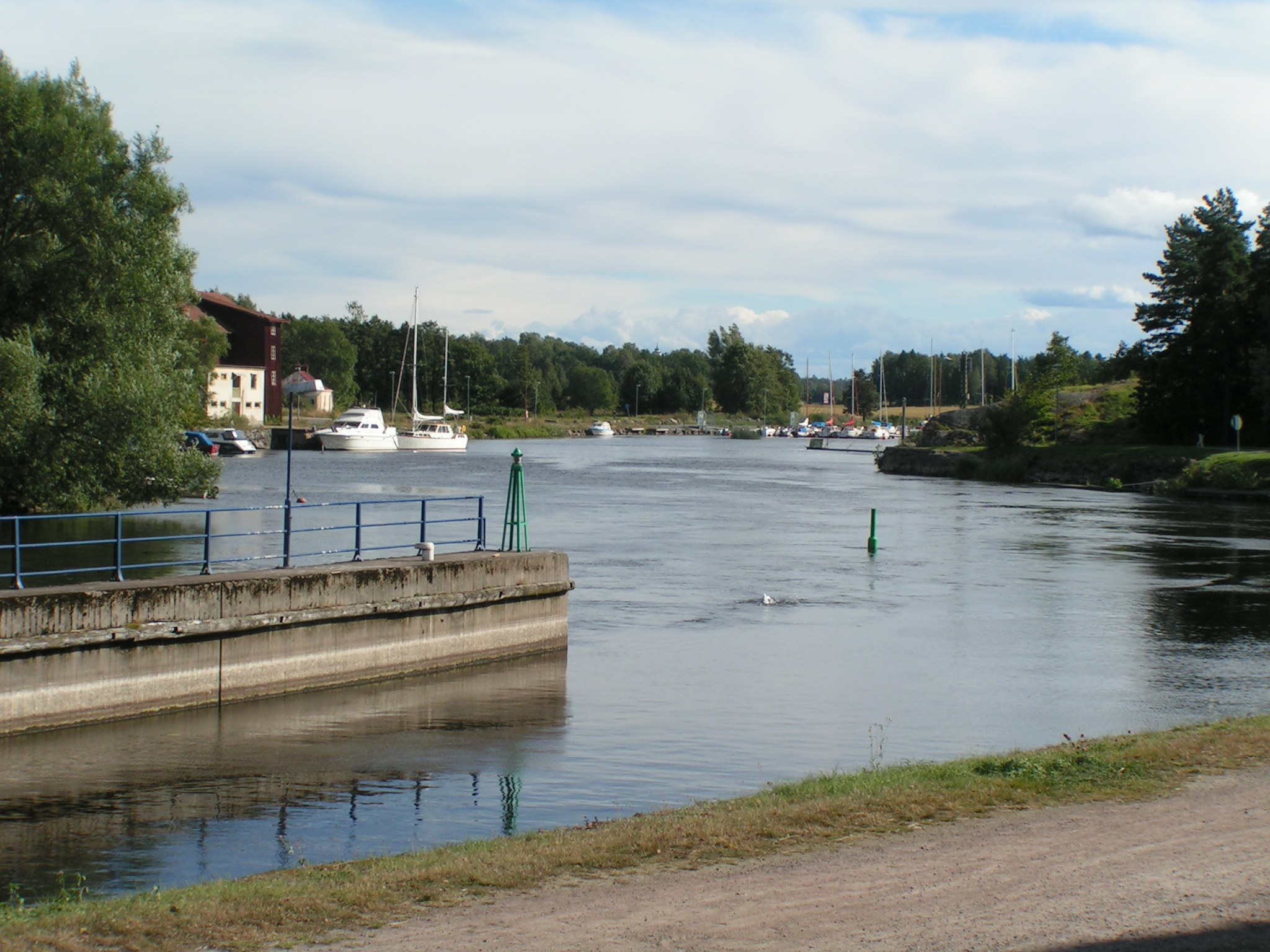

Location
- Country: Sweden
- County: Värmland County

Physical characteristics
- Source: Glafsfjorden
- Mouth: Vänern
  - coordinates: 59°06′N 12°54′E
- Length: 190 km (120 mi)
- Basin size: 4,760 km^{2} (1,840 sq mi)
- Discharge
  - average: 58 m^{3}/s (2,000 cu ft/s)

Byälven is a river in Varmland County, Sweden. It flows from Lake Glafsfjorden to Lake Vänern, and is some 40 km (25 mi) in length.
