= Caves of Ryd =

Caves with diabase pillars in Sweden

The Caves of Ryd is a number of diabase pillars on the east side of the mountain of Billingen in Sweden. It is a popular lookout point over the city of Skövde, and is easily accessible on foot. The road is steep and difficult to travel by car. Underneath the pillars, there is difficult terrain occupied by big boulders. Many species of moss grows here.

The Caves of Ryd were likely created from a landslide many years ago, during which the diabase pillars broke loose and slipped over the shale underneath creating a ravine-like shape rather than a cave-like one.

A short way north of the Caves of Ryd lies the remains of the castle Ymsingsborg, which is also a popular lookout point.
