= Hindens Rev =

Nature reserve in Västra Götaland, Sweden

Coordinates: 58°34′34″N 12°53′59″E

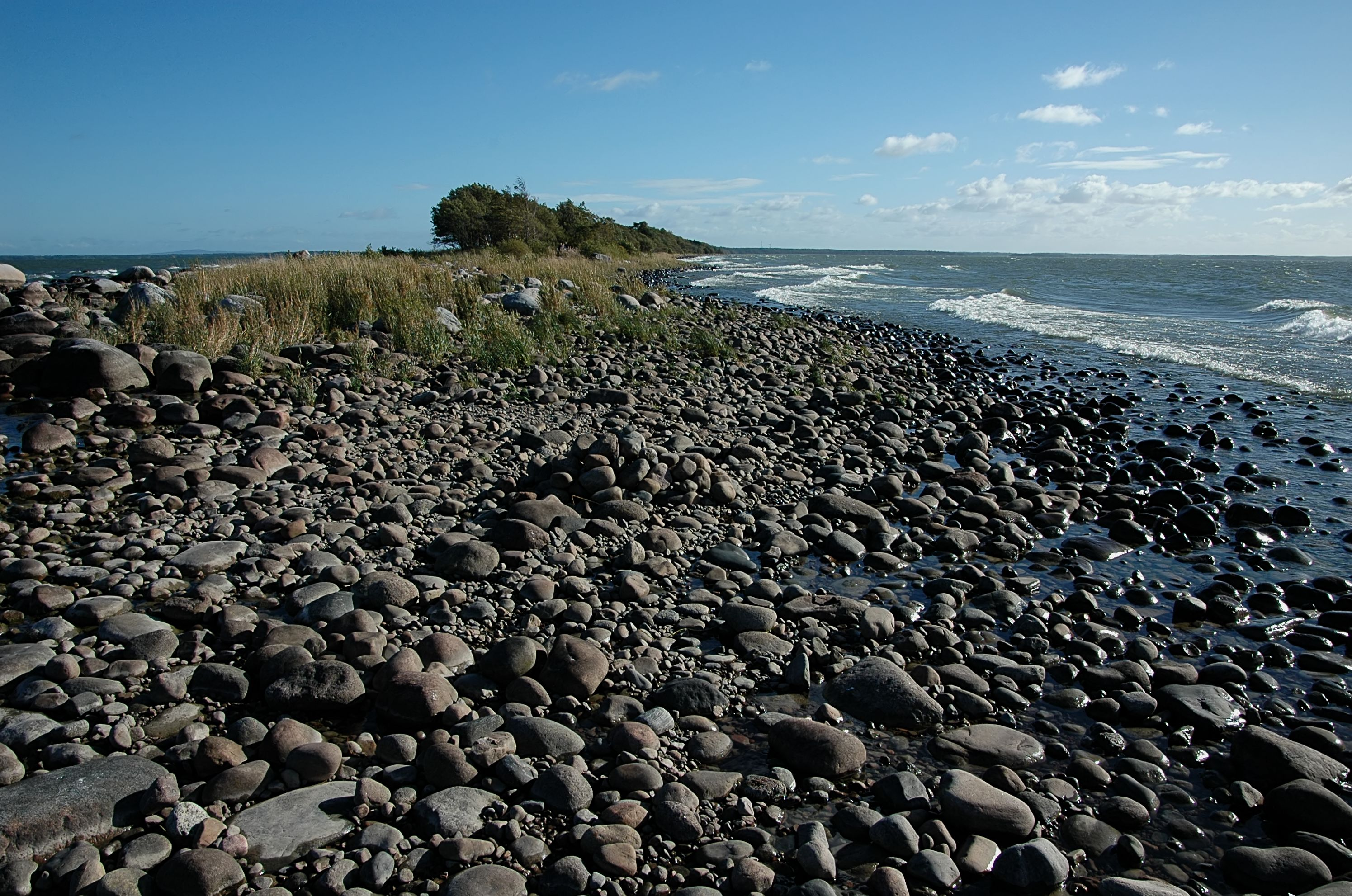
View from the endpoint of the peninsula.

Hindens Rev is a long, narrow, straight peninsula that projects westwards from Kålland into Dalbosjön, the western part of lake Vänern. Hindens rev is a terminal moraine and is part of what is known as the central Swedish terminal moraine zone. The latter is in turn part of a series of terminal moraines that runs from southern Norway through Dalsland, Skaraborg and Östergötland, continuing under the Baltic Sea into southern Finland and Russia as the Salpausselkä moraine which separates lakes Ladoga and Saimaa. These moraines were formed during the Younger Dryas period, about 11,000 years ago, when the ice cap from the last ice age temporarily ceased withdrawing and rocks and other glacial materials emerged from the melting ice were deposited in front of the glacier terminus.

The narrow peninsula is about five kilometers long and never wider than 100 meters, usually significantly narrower. Its highest elevation over the level of lake Vänern is 21 meters. Hindens Rev is highest by the mainland, and lowers gradually until it submerges after five kilometers. The formation continues under water as a series of reefs. At high tide its extreme point becomes five small island called Killingarna ("the [goat] Kids"). The moraine reappears twelve kilometers away on the western shore of Vänern, where it is known as Hjortens udde.

In addition to pines, rowans, birches and aspens grow on Hindens Rev. Several protected plant species also grow there. Hindens Rev is a nature reserve classed as riksintresse for nature conservation and outdoors activities. Hindens Rev is a popular destination for picnickers and tourists, offering hiking, fishing and birding opportunities in summer and tour skating in winter.

== Gallery ==
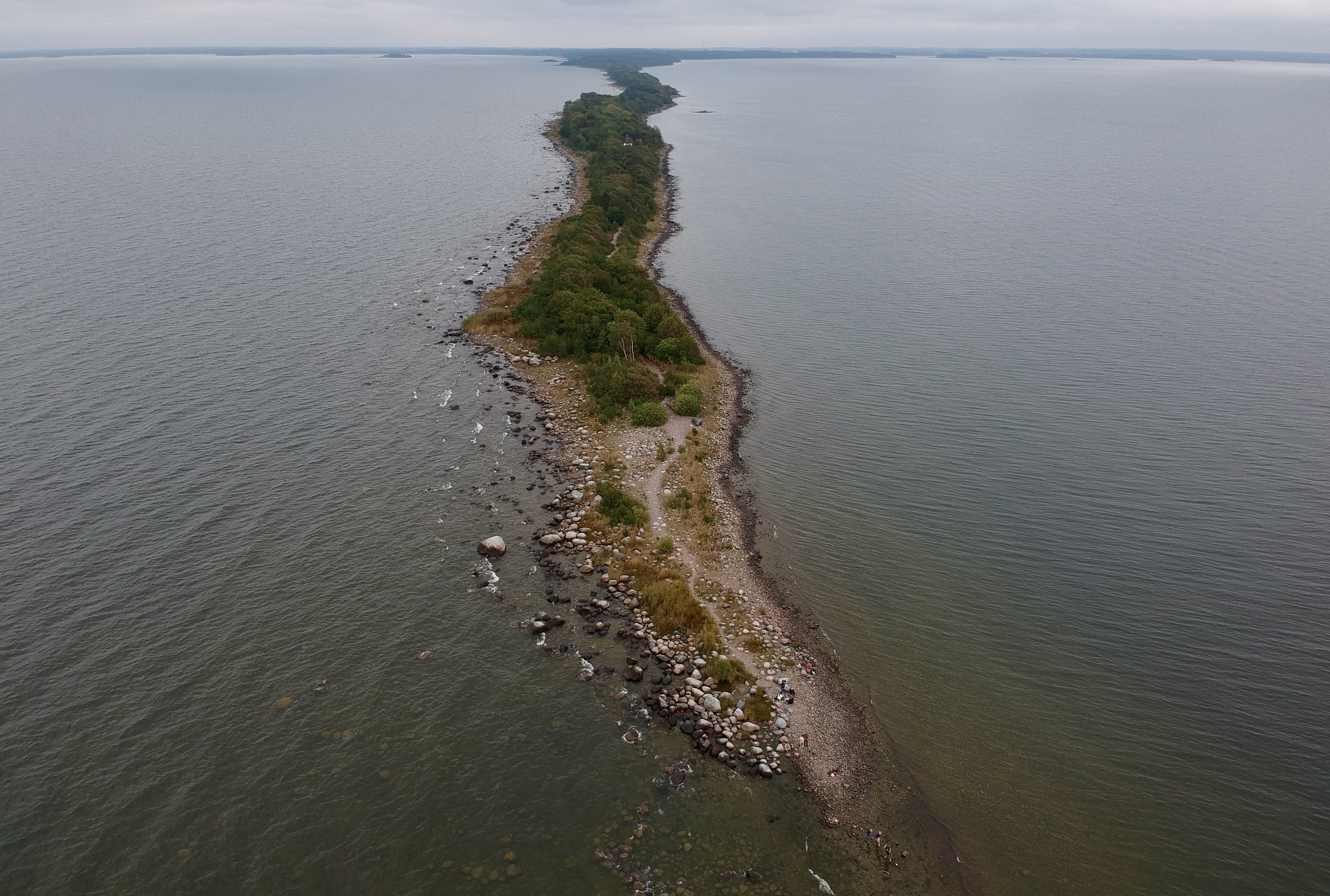
View from above

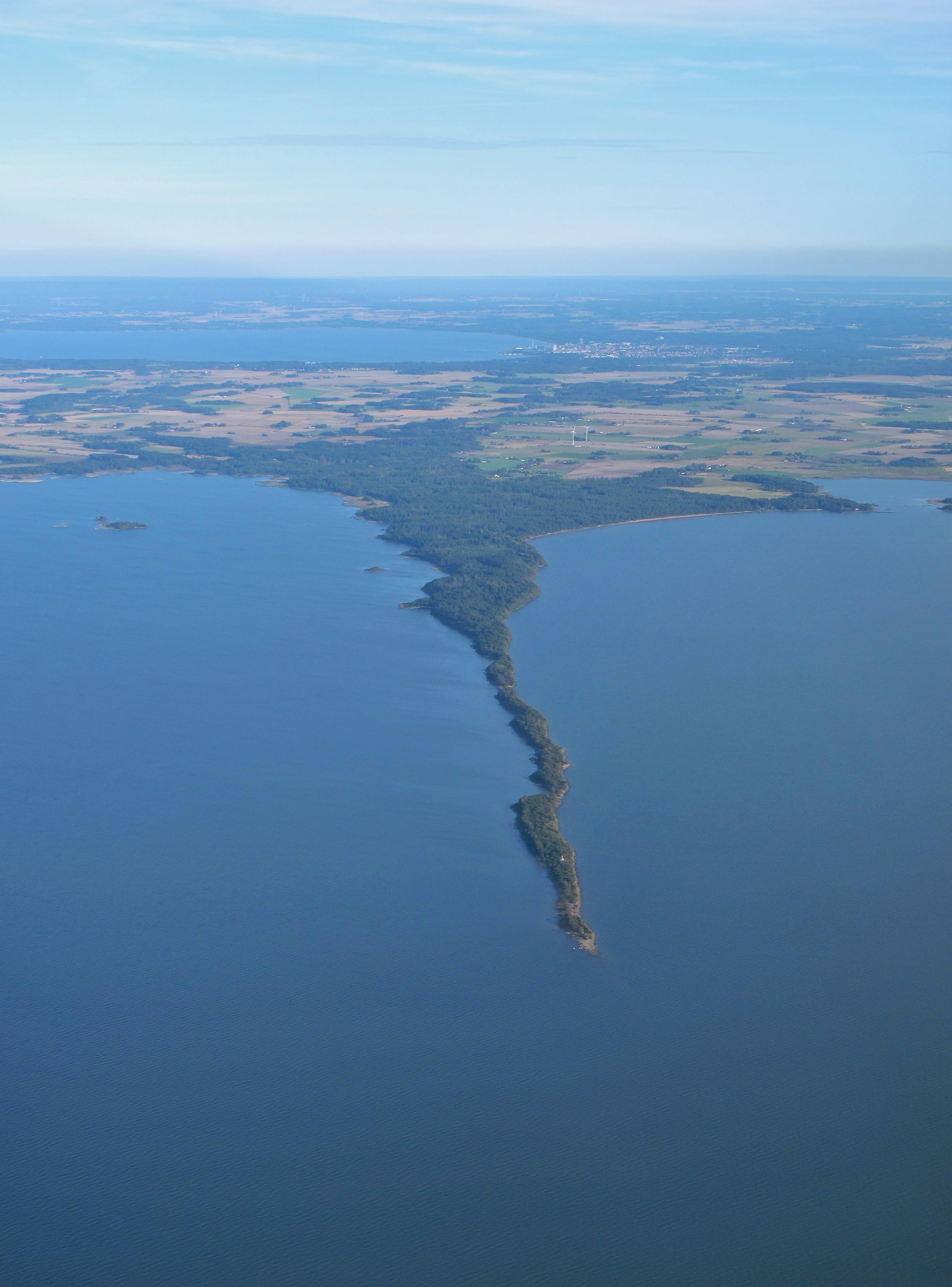

== See also ==
- Salpausselkä
- Vänersnäs
- Parkudden
