= Vänern =

Largest lake in Sweden

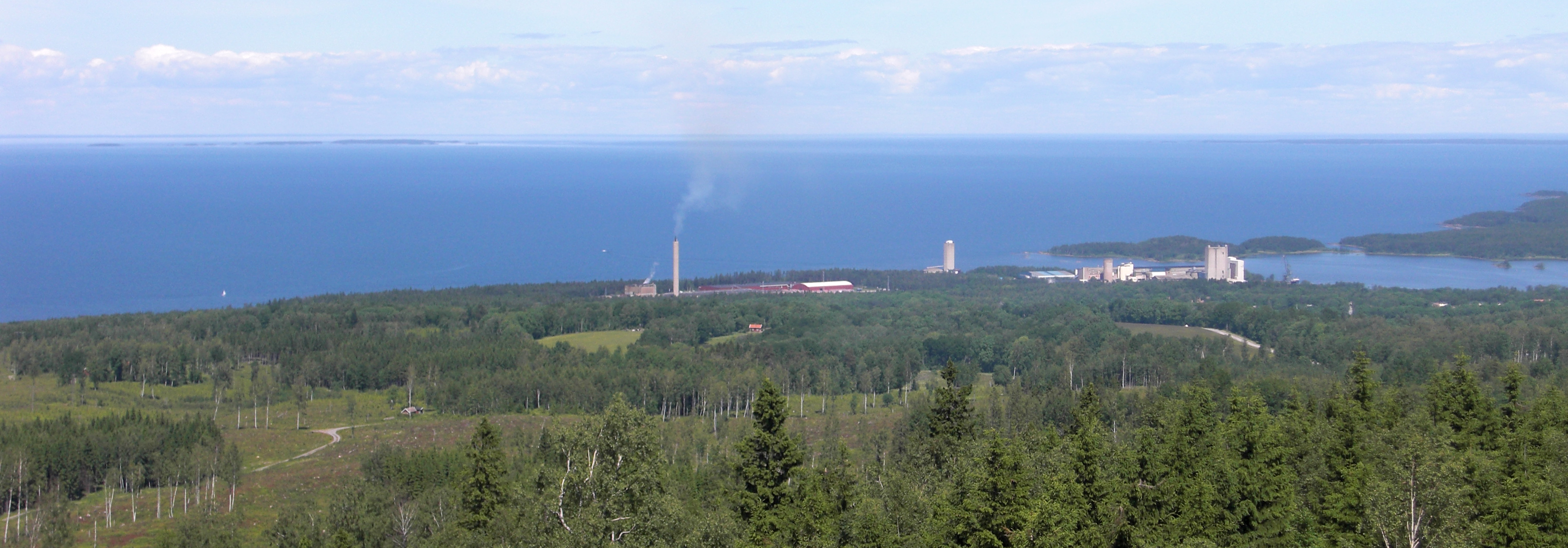
- View from Kinnekulle

- Location within Sweden

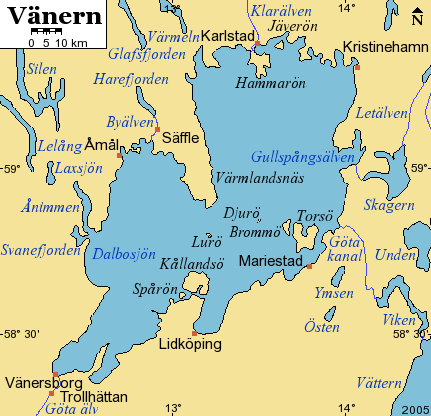
- Detail map of the lake with surroundings
- Coordinates: 58°55′N 13°30′E
- Primary inflows: Klarälven
- Primary outflows: Göta älv
- Basin countries: Sweden
- Surface area: 5,650 km^{2} (2,180 sq mi)
- Average depth: 27 m (89 ft)
- Max. depth: 106 m (348 ft)
- Water volume: 153 km^{3} (37 mi^{3})
- Residence time: 8 to 9 years
- Surface elevation: 44 m (144 ft)
- Islands: Brommö, Djurö, Fågelö, Hammarö, Kållandsö, Lurö (22,000 in total, including skerries)

Vänern (/ˈveɪnərn/ VAY-nərn, US also /ˈvɛnərn/ VEN-ərn, Swedish: [ˈvɛ̂ːnɛɳ]) is the largest lake in Sweden, the largest lake in the European Union and the third-largest lake in Europe after Ladoga and Onega in Russia. It is located in the provinces of Västergötland, Dalsland, and Värmland in the southwest of the country. With its surface located at 44 metres (144 ft) above sea level and a maximum depth of 106 metres (348 ft), the lowest point of the Vänern basin is 62 metres (203 ft) below sea level. The average depth is a more modest 27 metres (89 ft), which means that the lake floor is above sea level on average.

Vänern drains into Göta älv towards Gothenburg and the Kattegat opening strait between the Atlantic Ocean’s North Sea and the Baltic Sea. It is the only one of the ten largest lakes in Sweden not to drain out to the eastern coastline. The Göta Canal built in the 19th century forms a waterway that runs to Vättern wholly rising when proceeding eastward, and then a navigable river linking the east coast with Vänern. The main inflow of water comes from Klarälven entering Vänern near Karlstad with its source in Trøndelag in Norway.

== History ==
The southeastern part of the Vänern is a depression that appears to have been formed by erosion of Paleozoic-aged sedimentary rock during the Quaternary glaciation. Such erosion would have re-exposed parts of the Sub-Cambrian peneplain. Because the Sub-Cambrian peneplain gently tilts towards the north and west in this area, the southeast part of the lake is rather shallow. The western shore of the lake largely follows a fault scarp associated with the Vänern-Göta Fault.

The lake reached its present form after the Quaternary glaciation about 10,000 years ago; when the ice melted, the entire width of Sweden was covered in water, creating a strait between Kattegat and the Gulf of Bothnia. When post-glacial rebound surpassed a concurrent sea-level rise, lake Vänern became a part of the Ancylus Lake that occupied the Baltic basin. Vänern was connected to Ancylus Lake by a strait at Degerfors, Värmland. Lakes such as Vänern and Vättern were cut off from the Baltic by further uplifting. As a result of this former connection to the sea, there are species here not normally encountered in freshwater lakes, such as the amphipod Monoporeia affinis. A Viking ship was found at the bottom of the lake on May 6, 2009.

A story told by the 13th-century Icelandic mythographer Snorri Sturluson in his Prose Edda about the origin of Mälaren was probably originally about Vänern: the Swedish king Gylfi promised a woman, Gefjon, as much land as four oxen could plough in a day and a night, but she used oxen from the land of the giants, and moreover uprooted the land and dragged it into the sea, where it became the island of Zealand. The Prose Edda says that 'the inlets in the lake correspond to the headlands in Zealand'; since this description is much more true of Vänern, the myth was probably originally about Vänern, not Mälaren.

The Battle on the Ice of Lake Vänern was a 6th-century battle recorded in the Norse sagas and referred to in the Old English epic Beowulf. In Beowulf, Vänern is stated to be near the location of the dragon's mound at Earnaness.

== Geography ==
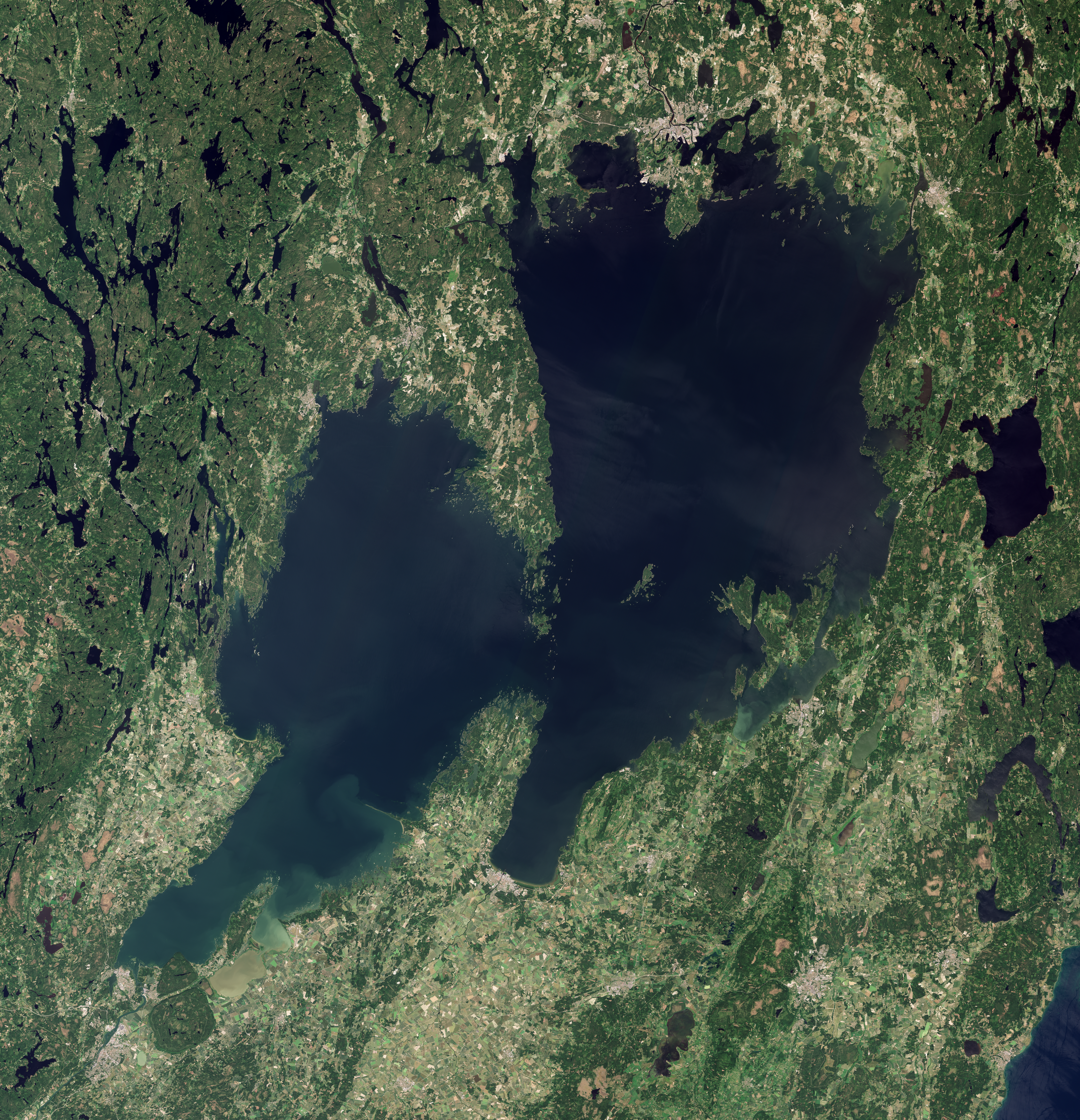
Satellite image of Vänern

Vänern covers an area of 5,655 km^{2} (2,183 sq mi), approximately twice the surface area of Luxembourg. Its surface is 44 m (144 ft) above sea level and it is on average 27 m (89 ft) deep. The maximum depth of the lake is 106 m (348 ft) The water level of the lake is regulated by the Vargön Hydroelectric Power Station.

Geographically, it is situated on the border between the Swedish regions of Götaland and Svealand, divided between several Swedish provinces: The western body of water is known as the Dalbosjön, with its main part belonging to Dalsland; the eastern body is known as Värmlandsjön, its northern part belonging to Värmland and the southern to Västergötland.

Its main tributary is Klarälven, which flows into the lake near the city of Karlstad, on the northern shore. Other tributaries include Gullspångsälven, Byälven and Norsälven. It is drained to the south-west by Göta älv, which forms part of the Göta Canal waterway, to Lake Viken into Lake Vättern, southeast across Sweden.

The economic opportunities Vänern offers are illustrated by the surrounding towns, which have supported themselves for centuries by fishing and allowing easy transportation to other cities or west by Göta älv to the sea of Kattegat. This directly includes: Karlstad (chartered in 1584), Kristinehamn (1642), Mariestad (1583), Lidköping (1446) Vänersborg (1644), Åmål (1643), Säffle (1951), and indirectly Trollhättan (1916).

The Djurö archipelago surrounds the island of Djurö, in the middle of the lake, and has been given national park status as Djurö National Park.

The ridge (plateau mountain) Kinnekulle is a popular tourist attraction near the south-eastern shore of Vänern. It has the best view over the lake (about 270 metres (890 ft) above the lake level). Another nearby mountain is Halleberg.

== Environment ==
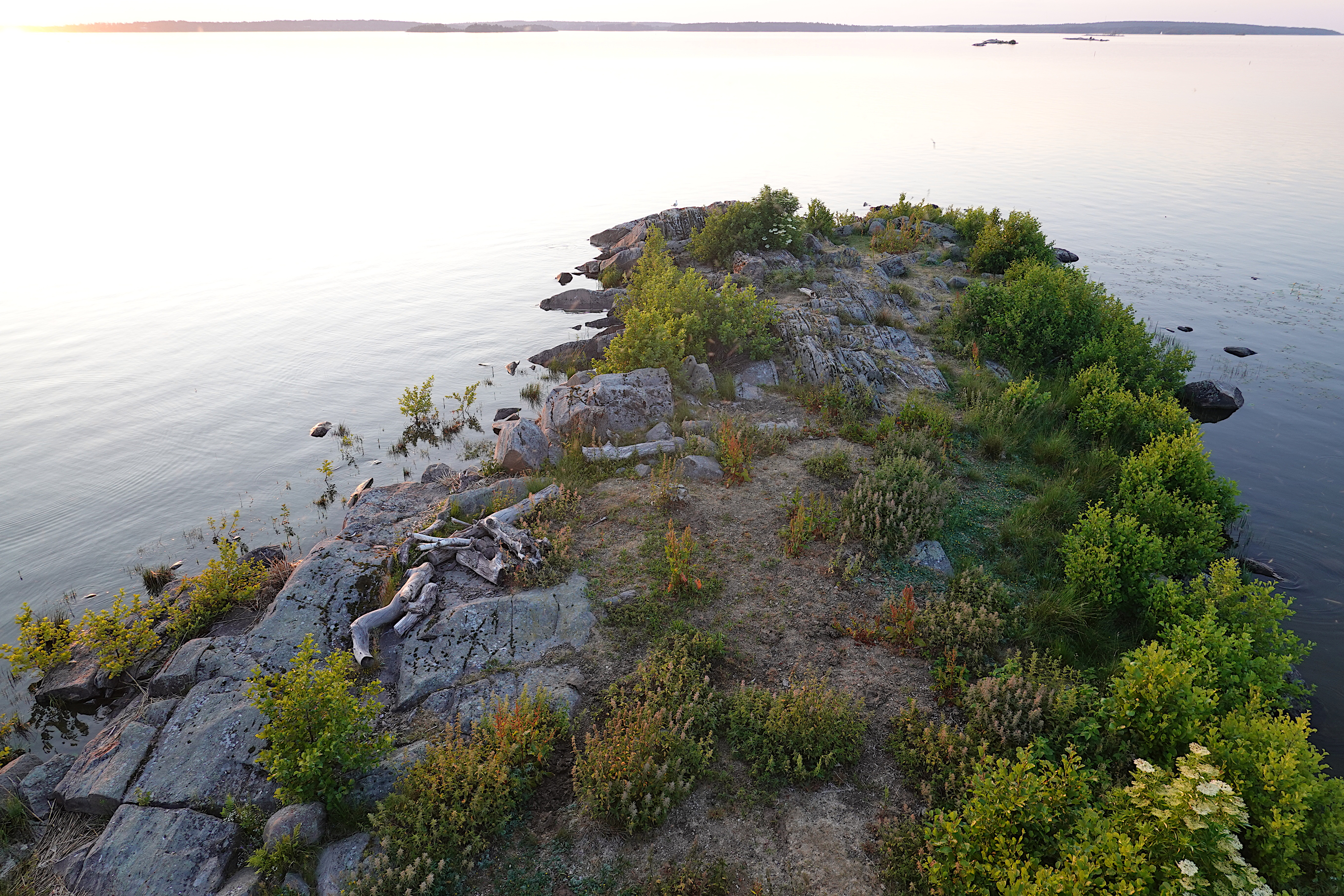
View towards lake, Gamla Ekuddens naturreservat, Lake Vänern, Sweden. Taken from observation tower.

Environmental monitoring studies are conducted annually. In a 2002 report, the data showed no marked decrease in overall water quality, but a slight decrease in visibility due to an increase of algae. An increasing level of nitrogen had been problematic during the 1970s through 1990s, but is now being regulated and is at a steady level.

Some bays also have problems with eutrophication and have become overgrown with algae and plant plankton.

== Fish ==
Vänern has many different fish species. Locals and government officials try to enforce fishing preservation projects, due to threats to the fish habitat. These threats include water cultivation in the tributaries, pollution and the M74 syndrome. Sport fishing in Vänern is free and unregulated, both from the shore and from boats (with some restrictions, e.g. a maximum of three salmon or trout per person per day). Commercial fishing requires permission.

In the open waters of Vänern, the most common fish is the smelt (Osmerus eperlanus), dominating in the eastern Dalbosjön, where the average is 2,600 smelt per hectare. The second most common is the vendace (Coregonus albula), also most prominently in Dalbosjön, with 200–300 fish per hectare. The populations may vary greatly between years, depending on temperature, water level and quality.

The most important large fish in the lake are brown trout (Salmo trutta) and zander (Sander lucioperca). The most important small fish is the stickleback.

Vänern has five distinguished species of whitefish:

- Coregonus pallasii (also common in Neva, Gulf of Finland, Baltic Sea)
- Lacustrine fluvial whitefish (Coregonus megalops)
- Coregonus maxillaris (population mainly known around Sweden)
- Coregonus nilssoni
- Valaam whitefish (Coregonus widegreni)
- Coregonus maxillaris

== Birds ==
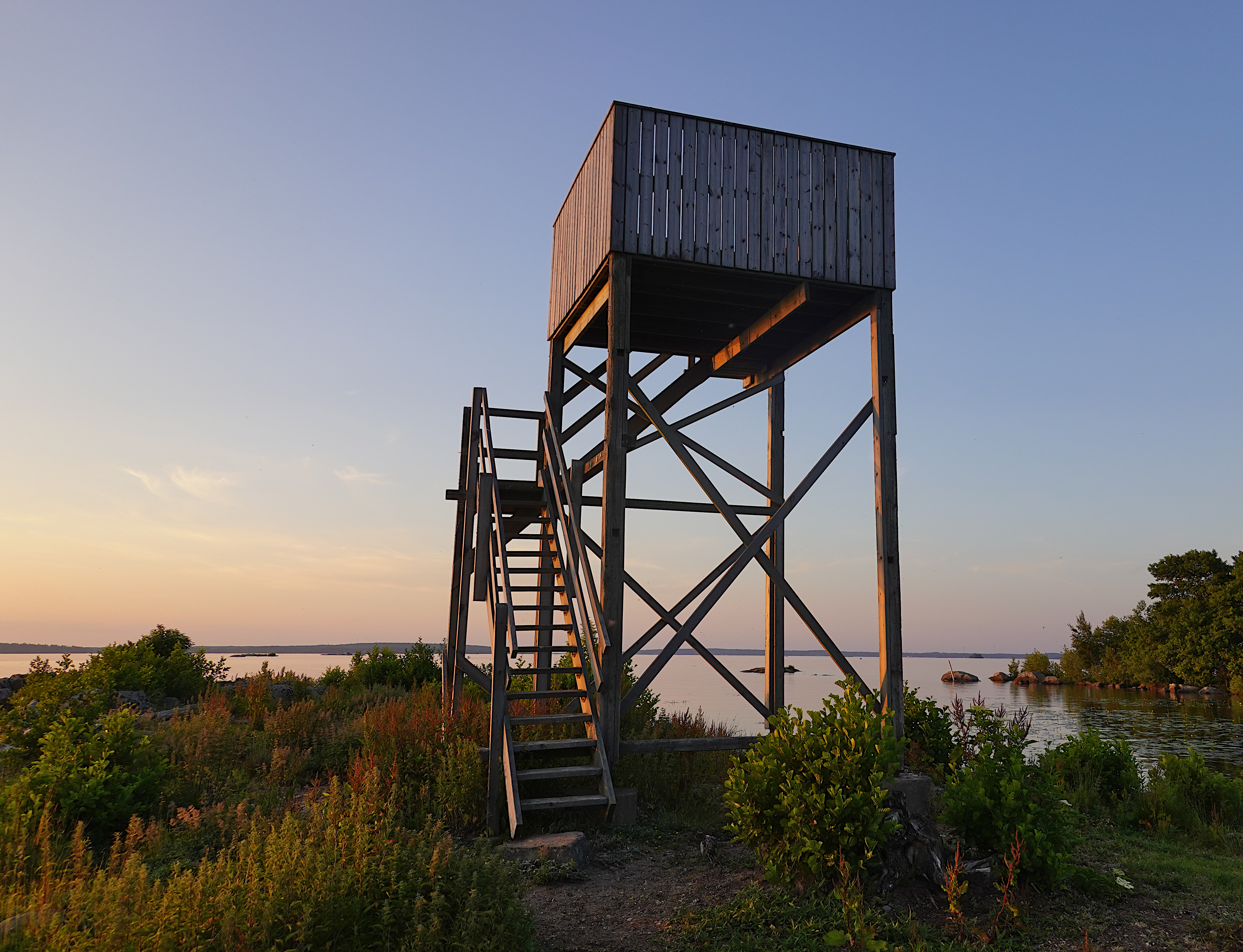
Timber observation tower in Gamla Ekuddens naturreservat, Lake Vänern, Sweden

The most common birds near Vänern are terns and gulls.

Great cormorants have returned and are flourishing. This has contributed to the increase in the population of white-tailed sea eagles, who feed on cormorants.

== See also ==
- Hindens Rev
- Lakes of Sweden
