= Halleberg =

Table mountain by lake Vänern in western Sweden

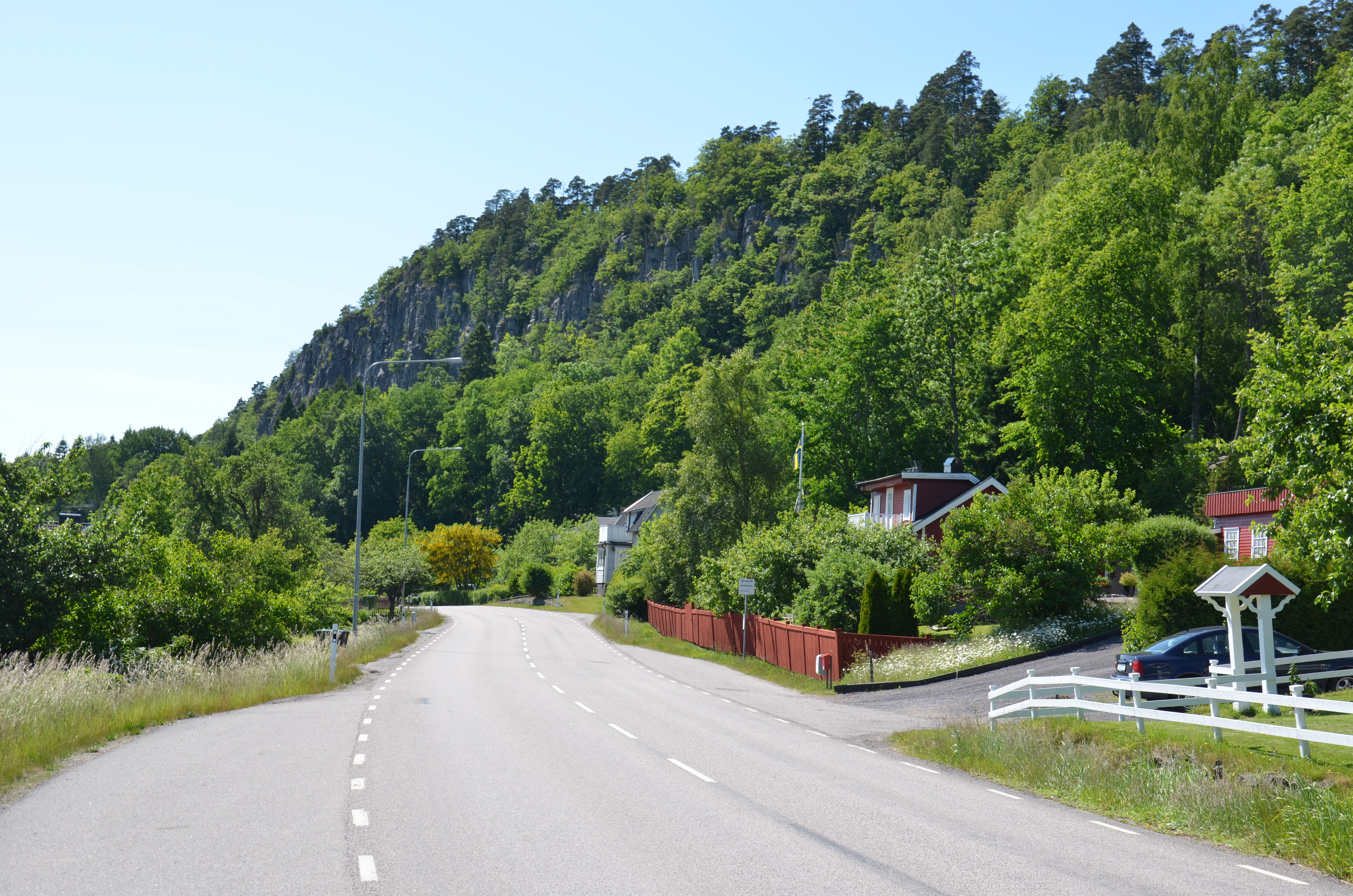
- Halleberg seen from the main road to Vargön from the east

Highest point
- Elevation: 155 metres (509 ft)
- Prominence: 155 metres (509 ft)
- Coordinates: 58°23′N 12°27′E

Naming
- Language of name: Swedish

Geography

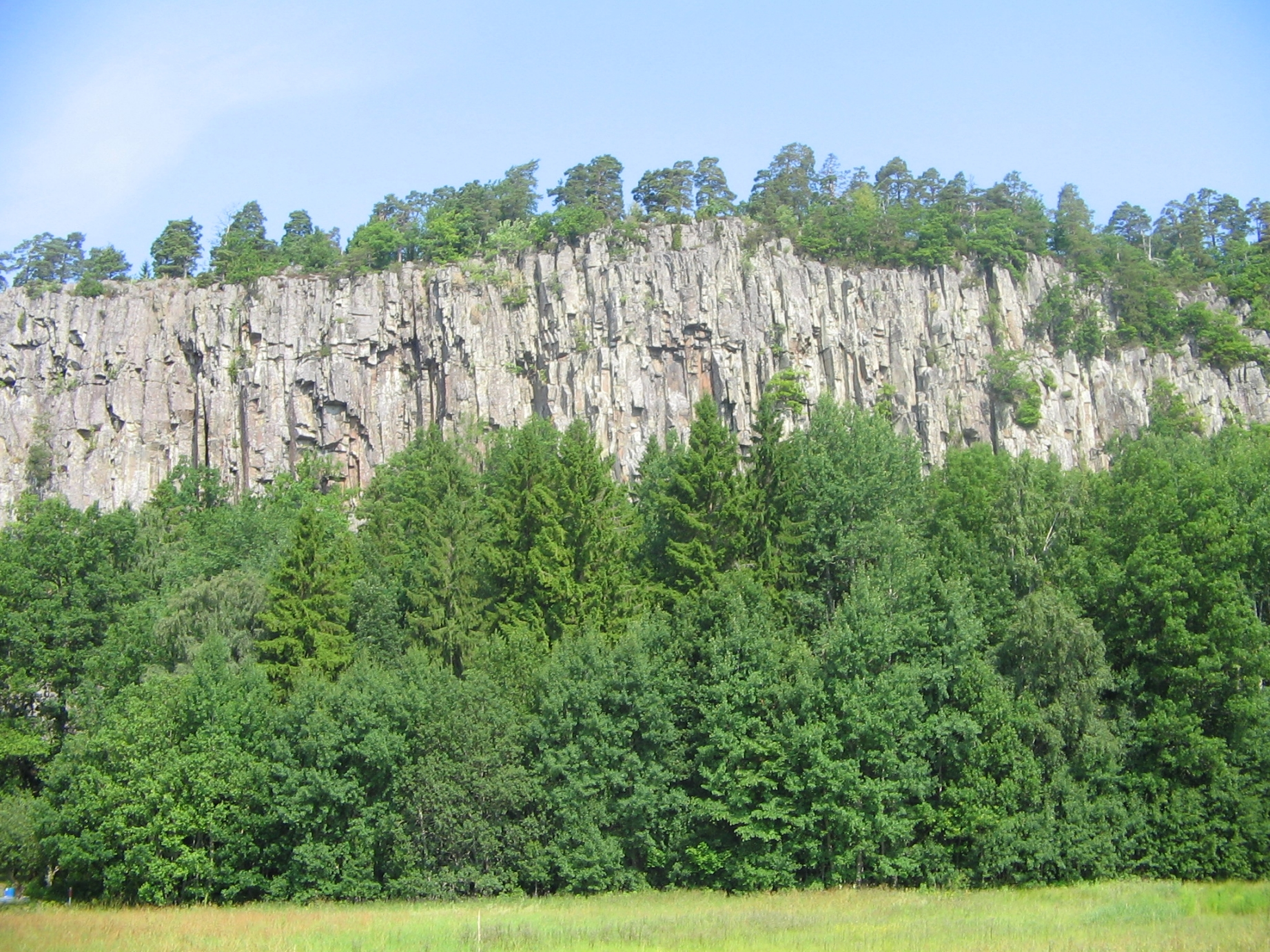
Halleberg scree

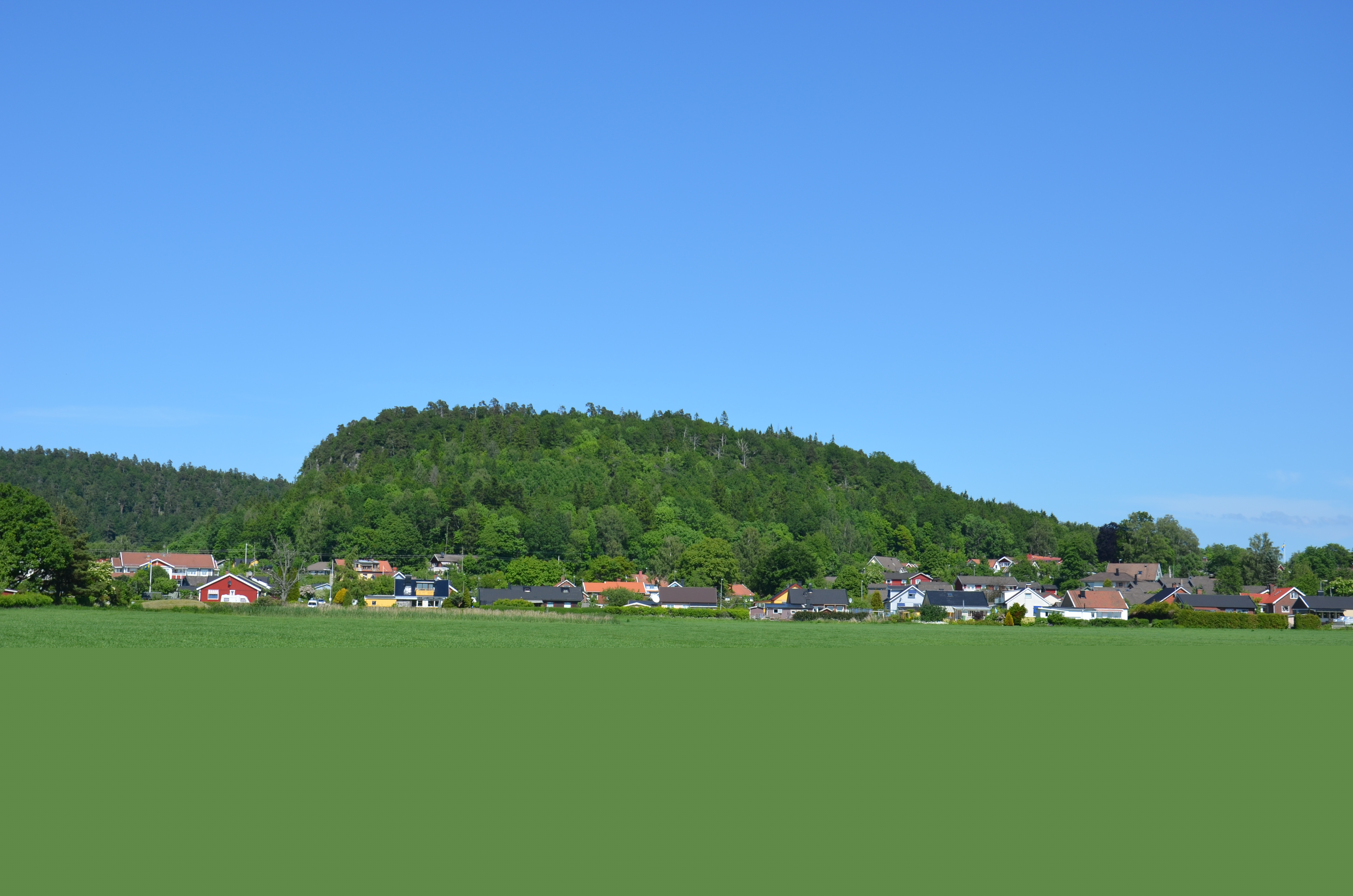
Halleberg from Vargön

Halleberg is a table mountain by lake Vänern in Vänersborg Municipality, Västergötland, Sweden.

Halleberg, part of which protrudes into Lake Vänern is separated in the south by about 500 m (1,600 ft) wide valley from the adjacent Hunneberg (also a table mountain). The northern part of Halleberg called Hallesnipen.

== Geology ==
Hallberg has an average height of about 90 m (300 ft) above lake Vänern, or 134 ft (41 m) above sea level; the highest point is 155 m (509 ft) above sea level.

Halleberg consists of Cambrian, Ordovician and Permian rocks. The Palaeozoic rocks are deposited directly on the crystalline peneplain bedrock, which in this range consists of göta granite. The Cambrian sedimentary rocks are sandstone and alum shale. The sandstone layer is on average 24 m (79 ft) thick. Above this there is then a 0.3 m (0.98 ft) thick slate which in turn is covered by about 24 m (79 ft) of alum shale. The Ordovician is represented by a calcareous slate. During the Permian diabase pushed between the still present and since eroded Ordovician layers, which lay as a protective cover over the softer sedimentary layers under it and thus protected the mountain from erosion. The diabase on Västgötabergen is known locally for staircases.

== Economic Geology ==
Anthraconite, alum shale and diabase has previously been mined in several places on the mountain.

== Nature ==
Around the foot of the Halleberg are elongated scree of large stacked, sharp-edged boulders. In a few places, there are so-called steps, where there are roads or paths up the mountain. The vegetation on the mountain plateau is dominated by spruce and pine, and the expanse of bog, while on scree lower parts are more species. In contrast to Hunneberg, on Halleberg there is simply lake Hallsjön, three-kilometer long but narrow.

On Halleberg is the Ecopark Halle-Hunneberg (comprising the Halle- och Hunnebergs platåers naturreservat and the Halle- och Hunnebergs branters naturreservat).

== Halleberg Ancient Fortress ==
Halleberg is also Scandinavia's largest hillfort (about 20 km^{2} (7.7 mi^{2})). It is almost completely naturally fortified by the mountain's steep slopes, large stone ramparts being primarily at the Storgårdsklev steps in the southwest. There are three stone ramparts, with a total length of 1,800 m (5,900 ft), of which the longest is about 700 m (2,300 ft) long and 1 m (3.3 ft) high. Small ramparts have in passable gaps, for example at the Lilleskog and Björkås trappa staircase. The hill fort was built during the Migration Period of the 3rd-4th centuries. It was a refuge during the Swedish-Danish wars of the 15th-17th centuries, for example during the Gyldenløve War in 1676, but also during Gustav III's Russian War of 1788. The Danes only managed to conquer the castle once, in 1612. During the Basse War (Bassefejden in Swedish) of 1490–1510, Halleberg was besieged for seven years.

The place name (in about 1325 Haal), had previously only a hall, including a 'rock face' entrance hall, a 'cliff' or similar.

== See also ==
- Hunneberg
