= Djurö National Park =

National park in Sweden

- Djurö nationalpark
- IUCN category II (national park)
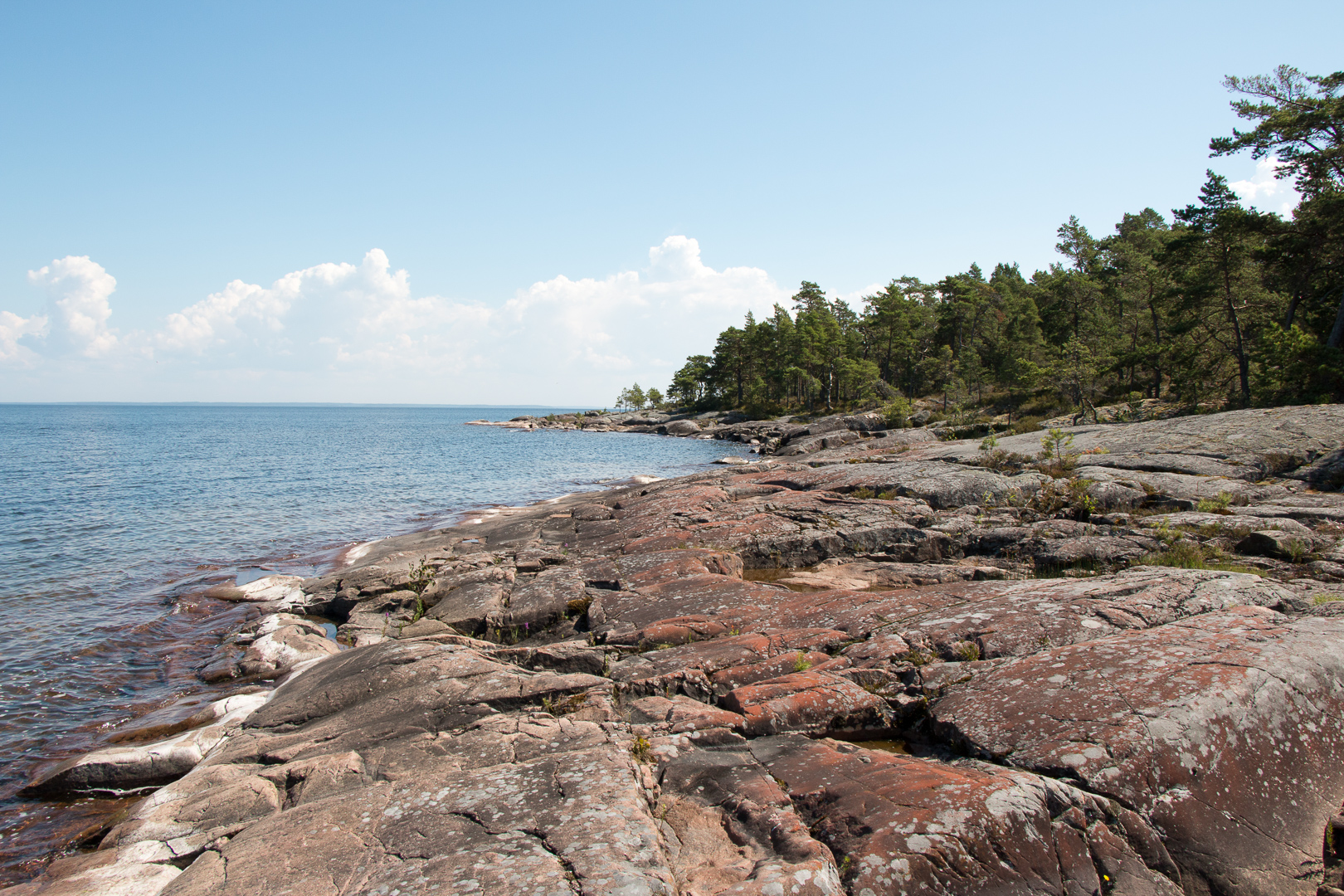
- Timmerviken bay, main island
- Interactive map of Djurö National Park
- Location: Västra Götaland County, Sweden
- Nearest city: Mariestad, Karlstad
- Coordinates: 58°51′N 13°28′E
- Area: 24 km^{2} (9.3 sq mi)
- Established: 1991
- Governing body: Naturvårdsverket

Djurö is an island, a surrounding archipelago of some 35 islands, and a national park situated in Sweden's biggest lake, Vänern. Established in 1991 by regeringsproposition 1990/91:31, the national park has an area of 24 km^{2} (9.3 mi^{2}), and includes all the islands of the archipelago.

The islands have been sparsely inhabited since 1500s with three families living here at its population peak. The islands are presently uninhabited, but there is a hunting lodge and an unmanned lighthouse. Wildlife includes fallow deer and a great variety of birds including ospreys, hobby, oystercatchers and great black-backed gulls. The horizon of Djurö consists only of water, except in southern direction where Kinnekulle is visible.

== See also ==
- List of national parks of Sweden
