= Billingen =

Table mountain in Sweden

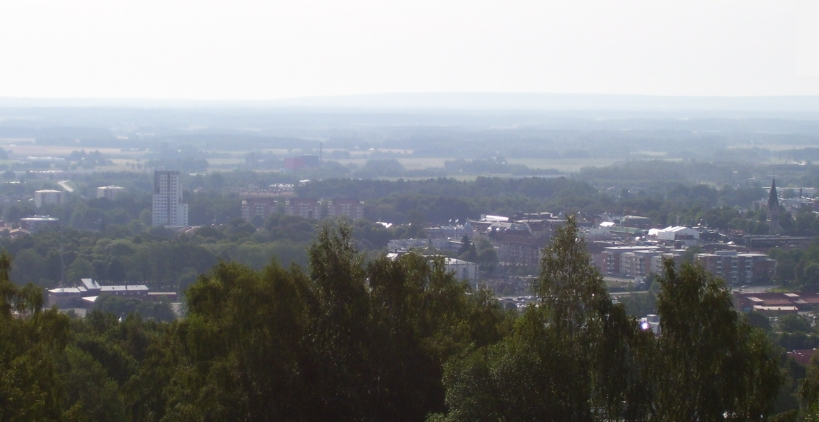
- View of Skövde from Billingen.

Highest point
- Elevation: 304 m (997 ft)
- Coordinates: 58°24′N 13°46′E

Geography
- Location: Skara and Skövde municipalities, Västra Götaland, Sweden
- Parent range: Westrogothian Mesas

Billingen is the largest of the thirteen mesas in the Swedish county of Västra Götaland, with a maximum altitude of 304 metres (997 ft). The mesa extends in a north-southerly direct with a length of 23 kilometres (14 mi) and a width of 11 kilometres (6.8 mi). Billingen is divided into two parts by an east–west valley between Skövde and Varnhem. The mesa plateau is covered with vast forests and moorlands, including the nature reserve Blängsmossen with its unique flora.

The limestone at Billingen has been quarried for a long time for concrete manufacturing; diabase is also still quarried there.

The mesa, located between the two great lakes Vänern and Vättern, is also a popular nature resort with several nearby hotels, and an annual orienteering tournament is held here. The town of Skövde is built partially on the slopes of Billingens and the town center lies at the foot of the mesa.

Some additional local points of interest are Jättadalen (a dramatic ravine with a waterfall), Silverfallen, and the "caves of Ryd" which are better described as free-standing pillars of diabase.

== Geology ==
Billingen, like most of the other mesas in Västergötland, consists of sedimentary rock deposited during the Cambrian, Ordovician and Silurian periods (542 to 432 Ma), and a diabase intrusion associated with the Oslo Rift in the Permian period.

The bedding sequence begins with the crystalline bedrock of the Baltic Shield, followed by sandstone from the File Hajdar formation, uranium-rich alum shale, limestone, slate and a topmost 40-metre-thick (130 ft) layer of diabase, known locally as trapp (see Deccan Traps). The hard diabase layer resisted the glacial erosion of the last ice age.
