= Vänersborg Municipality =

Vänersborg Municipality Vänersborgs kommun
- Municipality
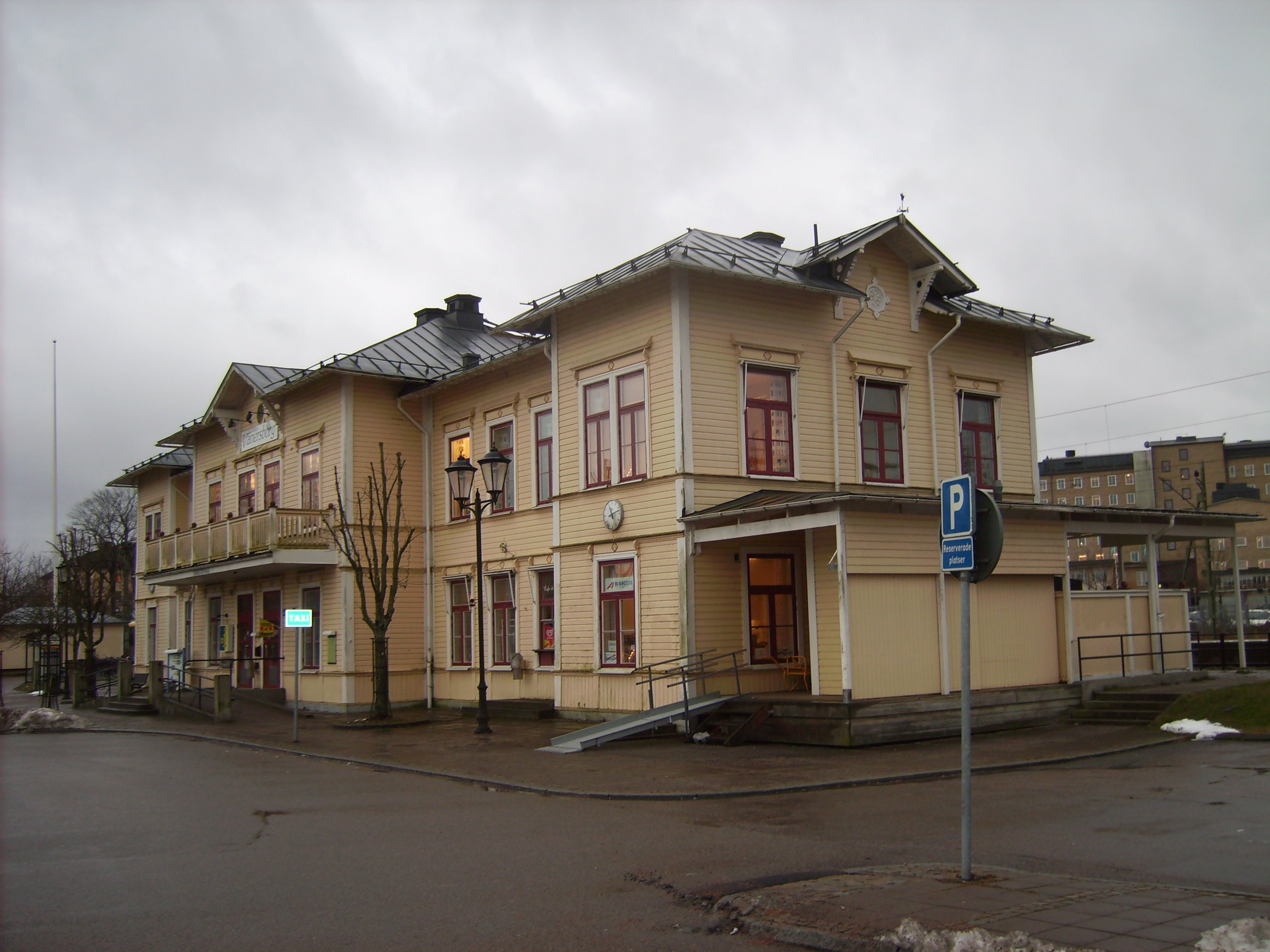
- Vänersborg Railway Station

- Coat of arms

- Coordinates: 58°23′N 12°19′E
- Country: Sweden
- County: Västra Götaland County
- Seat: Vänersborg

Area
  - Total: 898.83 km^{2} (347.04 sq mi)
  - Land: 642.7 km^{2} (248.1 sq mi)
  - Water: 256.13 km^{2} (98.89 sq mi)
- Area as of 1 January 2014.

Population (30 June 2025)
  - Total: 40,077
  - Density: 62.36/km^{2} (161.5/sq mi)
- Time zone: UTC+1 (CET)
  - Summer (DST): UTC+2 (CEST)
- ISO 3166 code: SE
- Province: Västergötland and Dalsland
- Municipal code: 1487
- Website: www.vanersborg.se

Vänersborg Municipality (Swedish: Vänersborgs kommun) is a municipality in Västra Götaland County in western Sweden. Its seat is located in the city of Vänersborg.

The present municipality was created during the local government reform in the early 1970s. In 1971 the City of Vänersborg became a municipality of unitary type and three years later it was amalgamated with three surrounding municipalities. The number of original local government entities (as of 1863) is eight.

== Localities ==
- Brålanda, 1,500 inhabitants
- Frändefors, 600
- Katrinedal, 300
- Nordkroken, 400
- Vargön, 5,000
- Vänersborg (seat), 22,000

== Demographics ==
This is a demographic table based on Vänersborg Municipality's electoral districts in the 2022 Swedish general election sourced from SVT's election platform, in turn taken from SCB official statistics.

In total there were 39,574 residents, including 30,181 Swedish citizens of voting age. 47.4% voted for the left coalition and 51.3% for the right coalition. Indicators are in percentage points except population totals and income.

Location	Residents	Citizen adults	Left vote	Right vote	Employed	Swedish parents	Foreign heritage	Income SEK	Degree
Location			%	%					
Blåsut	1,379	1,092	50.2	49.2	88	92	8	30,490	58
Brinketorp/Restad	1,346	994	50.8	48.3	80	82	18	28,514	50
Brålanda/Sundals Ryr	2,255	1,721	34.0	64.8	79	85	15	23,291	27
Centrala Vargön/V Tunhem	1,850	1,424	47.2	51.4	76	81	19	22,764	36
Centrala Vänersborg	2,018	1,658	52.5	46.0	73	77	23	21,327	40
Centrala Vänersborg N	1,891	1,659	53.7	45.7	78	90	10	23,875	48
Centrala Vänersborg S	2,050	1,672	51.4	46.3	71	69	31	20,573	40
Flanaden	1,920	991	66.5	30.0	50	21	79	14,095	19
Frändefors S/Vänerkusten	1,701	1,315	39.6	59.7	88	93	7	30,999	50
Frändefors V	1,274	999	33.9	65.4	85	96	4	26,563	28
Frändefors Ö/Vänerkusten	2,148	1,676	34.7	63.7	83	90	10	25,171	26
Hedmanstorget/Mariero Ö	2,071	1,483	59.0	39.0	66	60	40	19,942	35
Lyckhem S/Tenggrenstorp	1,483	1,145	53.1	44.8	72	66	34	22,398	34
Lyckhem V/Centrum V	1,897	1,598	49.7	49.1	78	85	15	25,338	46
Mariedal/Fridhem	2,004	1,485	48.6	50.1	80	77	23	26,556	42
Onsjö N	1,704	1,476	47.5	51.9	88	89	11	29,687	49
Onsjö S	1,394	993	47.9	51.6	82	87	13	29,994	49
Siviken/Väne Ryr	1,404	1,095	38.0	61.2	87	93	7	28,386	33
Torpa	1,491	1,006	59.2	39.5	60	45	55	18,389	26
Vargön NÖ	1,524	1,142	46.9	51.7	82	90	10	26,829	37
Vargön N/Nordkroken	1,946	1,441	47.4	52.0	87	91	9	29,764	46
Vänernäs/Lilleskog	1,465	1,125	44.7	54.6	84	91	9	27,628	41
Öxnered/Vassända	1,359	991	51.2	48.5	87	92	8	31,615	55
Source: SVT

== International relations ==
=== Twin towns — Sister cities ===
The following cities are twinned with Vänersborg:

- Arsuk, Sermersooq, Greenland
- Åland, Finland
- Eiði, Eysturoy, Faroe Islands
- Herning, Midtjylland, Denmark
- Lich, Hesse, Germany
- Husby, Schleswig-Holstein, Germany
- Kangasala, Western Finland, Finland
- Siglufjörður, Eyjafjörður, Iceland
- Holmestrand, Vestfold, Norway
- Räpina, Põlva County, Estonia
