= M74 syndrome =

Disease prevalent in Baltic salmon

The M74 syndrome is a reproduction disorder of salmon (Salmo salar) feeding in the Baltic Sea. M74 manifests as offspring mortality during the yolk-sac fry phase. Before dying, the yolk-sac fry display typical symptoms. Thiamine (vitamin B_{1}) deficiency in eggs is the immediate cause of M74 mortality. The deficiency can be prevented by thiamine treatments. For the first time Bulgarian research team opines that with M74 syndrome are affected also male gametes and worsened parameters of the spermiogram. The use of Bulgarian semen protective media 49282, 49283 and 49397 for trout sperm fertility improving was proposed.

The thiamine deficiency syndrome M74 is related to the fat and thiamine content of prey fish. The diet of Baltic salmon leads to thiamine deficiency in eggs and consequently to the mortality of yolk-sac fry: The main prey species of the Baltic salmon are sprat (Sprattus sprattus) and herring (Clupea harengus membras). Average fat content is greater in sprat than in herring. The fat content is highest and the thiamine concentration is lowest in the youngest sprat. The need for thiamine depends on the amount of fat in the diet. Thiamine deficiency in eggs results from an unbalanced diet abundant in fatty prey fish, such as young sprat, from which the supply of thiamine is insufficient in proportion to the supply of energy and unsaturated fatty acids for salmon.

== Relationships between fish stock changes in the Baltic Sea and the M74 syndrome ==
The M74 syndrome is connected to a weak Atlantic cod (Gadus morhua) stock and strong year classes of sprat in the Baltic Sea. Since the collapse, heavy fishing mortality as well as predation on cod eggs by sprat and food competition between sprat and young-of-the-year cod has inhibited cod recovery. Coincidentally with the decline in the cod stock since 1982, and following the consequent reduction in predation pressure, the sprat stock increased rapidly, and salmon therefore had more food. Salmon grew faster, resulting also in a high CF.
