= Hunneberg =

Mountain in Sweden

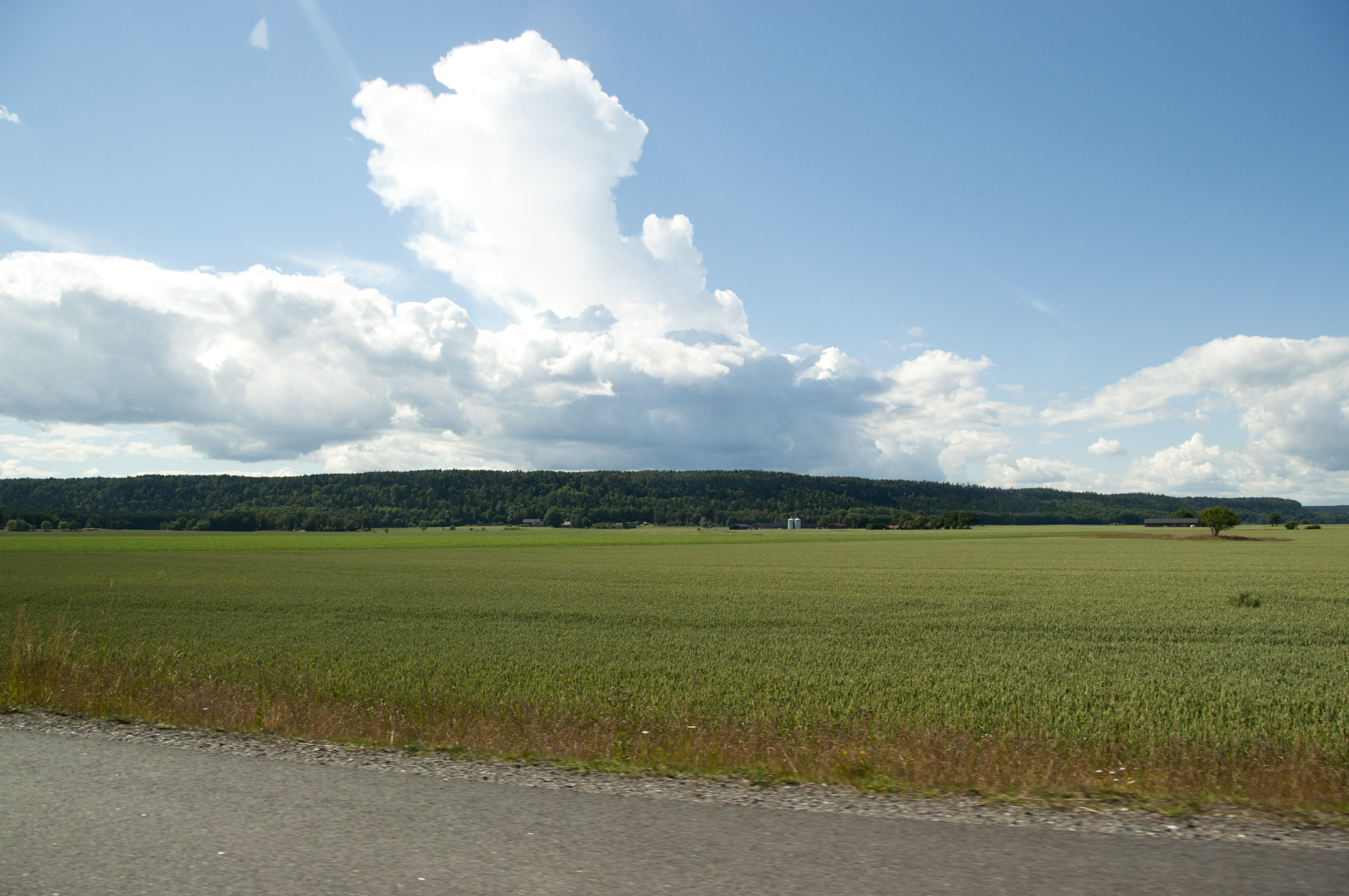

Highest point
- Elevation: 40 metres (130 ft)
- Prominence: 40 metres (130 ft)
- Coordinates: 58.3333°N 12.4500°E

Naming
- Language of name: Swedish

Geography
- Location: Vänersborg Municipality, Västra Götaland County

Hunneberg is a Swedish mountain just east of Vänersborg and Trollhättan, located in Vänersborg Municipality. The larger of the two, Hunneberg sits directly adjacent to the smaller Halleberg.
