= Cycle of erosion =

Model of geographic landscape evolution

The cycle of erosion, or geographic cycle, is an idealized model that explains the development of relief in landscapes. The model starts with the erosion that follows uplift of land above a base level and ends, if conditions allow, in the formation of a peneplain. Landscapes that show evidence of more than one cycle of erosion are termed "polycyclical". The cycle of erosion and some of its associated concepts have, despite their popularity, been a subject of much criticism.

== Description ==
William Morris Davis, the originator of the model, divided it into stages whose transition is gradual similar to the human life i.e. Youth Stage, Mature Stage and Old Stage. The model begins with an uplifted state of landscape. Then Davis defined:

- a youthful stage where river incision or vertical erosion is the dominant process shaping the landscape. During the youthful stage height, differences between uplands and valley bottoms increase rapidly.
- a mature stage in which height differences between valley bottoms and uplands are at their greatest. In the mature stage, slope decline becomes a more important phenomenon as the lateral erosion dominates, and uplands lose height more rapidly than rivers incise, effectively diminishing relief.
- in old stage, erosion has acted so long that the landscape, despite its original height, is reduced into a rolling lowland. That landscape of low relief is called a peneplain and may contain residual heights standing out from the general level. The peneplain can be uplifted, which starts a second erosion cycle.

Davis acknowledged that a full cycle was a special case and that initial uplift was not necessarily rapid or followed by a prolonged period of quiescence. However, as Walther Penck pointed out, Davis and his followers usually used a rapid uplift and quiescence approach to explain landscapes. This means that the model, as understood by most, assumes rapid and episodic tectonic uplift. Another characteristic of the model is that slopes evolve by decline, with initially-steep slopes worn out by erosion forming successively-gentler slopes. (Note: Alternative models of slope evolution are parallel slope and scarp retreat, championed by Lester Charles King, and slope replacement first proposed by Walther Penck. King considered scarp retreat a dominant process across the globe and claimed that slope decline was a special case of slope development seen only in very weak rocks that could not maintain a scarp. The modern understanding is that the evolution of slopes is much more complex than the classical models of decline, replacement, and retreat imply.) Weaknesses of the model are that it is mostly theoretical and deductive in nature and it does not take into account the complexity of tectonic movements or climate change. The nature of surface processes is also poorly represented by the model. The model in its original form is intended to explain relief development in temperate landscapes in which erosion by running water is assumed to be of prime importance. Nevertheless, the cycle of erosion has been extended, with modifications, into arid, semi-arid, savanah, selva, glacial, coastal, karst and periglacial areas. Writing in 1950 Louis C. Peltier claimed the cycle of erosion in maritime and boreal climates were the only one that had not been described in detail.

Variants of the cycle of erosion
Environment	Proposed by	Details
Arid	Davis, 1905	At the beginning of the cycle of erosion in arid climate there are numerous small basins to where material is washed during the scarce rainfall events. In the next stage (youthful stage) valleys are developed and highlands dissected by these. Gentle slopes and basins accumulated material derived from the highlands. In the mature stage drainage basins coalesce. At the end, a stage is reached in which the terrain has lost much of its relief and deflation hollows interfere with the drainage systems, breaking it up into local systems. During all stages sand and dust might be exported by wind to other landscapes.
Selva	Cotton, 1942	Rainforest hinders the erosion of hillsopes. Hillslopes have thick soil.
Semi-arid	Cotton, 1942	Forms together with the savannah cycle intermediate cycle between the "normal" and arid variants.
Savanna	Cotton, 1942	Associated with inselbergs and pediplains. Rivers are not incized enough to erode fresh rock, eroding instead "red soils" and weathered regolith. Flattish surfaces in savanna landscapes are eroded by river's lateral migration and by regularly flooding that leads the washing away of fines. The over-all effect a gradual loweing of this surfaces. Large inselbergs are polycyclic, but smaller tor are more recent features.
Coastal	Johnson, 1919	Alternate models are proposed for shore profiles: one for shore profiles of emergence and another for shore profiles of submergence. A complementary model can be applied to shorelines where different parts might have undergone submergence and emergence.
Glacial	Davis, 1900	The glacial cycle of erosion deals with mountainous regions and lacks an old stage since Davis argues that nothing more developed than mature glacial landscapes exists at present. A glacial cycle of erosion begins with a pre-glacial landscape. Over time valley glaciers erode the underlying rock at different rates, creating valleys and glaciers that are more entrenched than others. As time passes the less-entrenched glaciers reach the same levels of entrenchment as the more entrenched ones, since the deeper a glacier erodes, its erosive power diminishes. In a mature stage, valleys form smooth-sided troughs.
Karst	Cvijić, 1918	The cycle of erosion in karst regions has three phases. At first, the upper parts of fractures are dissolved, enlarged and filled with water. Normal fluvial valleys develop on the surface, small poljes might exist. Subsequently, re-routing of water by the growth of a karst system disorganized the fluvial drainage pattern, with valley bottoms developing large dolines and uvalas. Ridges between uvalas gradually disappear as those landforms coalesce. If the bedrock is underlain by insoluble rock, normal fluvial valleys will slowly re-appear once the underground river systems reach the insoluble rock. In the end, soluble rocks appear only as isolated hills. Contrary to Davis's original cycle of erosion, the karst cycle does not end in the formation of a peneplain.
Periglacial	Troll, 1948; Peltier, 1950	The periglacial cycle of erosion begins with a non-periglaciated landscape. Once-periglaciated mass wasting of regolith exposes bedrock in the upper slopes. The outcrops are then subject to frost weathering that makes slopes retreat forming extensive blockfields at the base of the bedrock areas. At a later stage, solifluction wears down summits and fills in topographic lows. (Note: An earlier cyclical model on the formation of cryoplanation terraces was proposed in 1943 by Soviet scientists S.G. Boch and I.I. Krasnov. Peltier's model was published long after the cycle of erosion was out of vougue among geomorphologists.)

== History ==
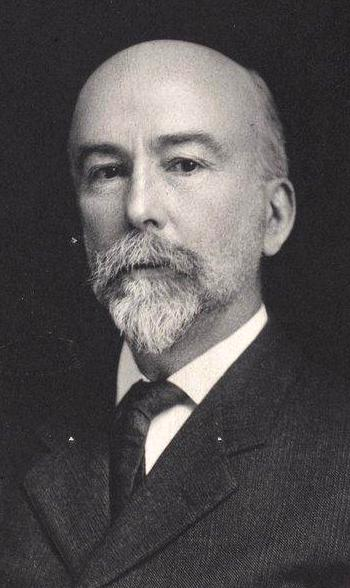
William Morris Davis (1850–1934), the creator of the model

=== Background ===
There had been some ideas on cyclical erosion in the Graeco-Roman world and then in the Islamic world and Europe during the Middle Ages. However the immediate influences of William Morris Davis, the creator of the cycle of erosion model, were 19th century American explorers. The end of the American Civil War (1861–1865) led to a resumption of the exploration of the western United States. Three explorers, John Wesley Powell, Clarence Edward Dutton and Grove Karl Gilbert, wrote about the geomorphology and geology in the landscapes they encountered. It was from these works that Davis borrowed many concepts used to construct the model. (Note: The influence of Gilbert on Davis has been labelled "ironic" by Anthony R. Orme "because Gilbert’s focus on geomorphic processes was later identified by many as the antithesis of Davisian geomorphology".)

It has been argued that Davis was also influenced by ideas from the field of biology, especially the Neo-Lamarckian thought that was current in the late 19th-century United States. It is thought that Davis received some of this Neo-Lamarckian influence from his tutor, Nathaniel Shaler. Other biological theories that may have shaped the cycle of erosion are those of orthogenesis and recapitulation both of which are linked to Neo-Lamarckianism. Darwin's evolution theory was a lesser influence relative to Neo-Lamarckism. The impact of these ideas can be hinted in the models' employment of the concept of "evolution" rather than "change", implying a predictable direction of landscape and landform change. It has been argued that "Davis consciously applied Darwinism to landscape".

=== Early acclaim and criticism ===
Davis conceived the cycle of erosion model in the 1880s while studying the Appalachians in Pennsylvania and Virginia. Davis wrote down the Cycle of erosion theory in detail for the first time in 1889. More fully developed by 1900 it received wide acclaim, but was never universally accepted. The initial enthusiasm and strength of the cycle of erosion model has been attributed to various causes. First, the model provided a framework to study areas and epochs in Earth history where erosion is the dominant process. Second, the model fitted well into the grand evolutionary thought that had emerged in the 19th century with Darwin's evolution theory. Lastly, some popularity can be attributed to Davis's lucid writing style. The model achieved its greatest popularity in the 1900–39 period when numerous studies on denudation chronology based on the model were published. In these studies usually two to five erosion cycles were identified. The approach of doing denudation chronology with the cycle of erosion model lost popularity from the 1930s onward. Arguably this was so because the approach did not provide any unforeseeable insights. An increasing number of geomorphologists had begun to study processes happening in the present and not in the past as done with the cycle of erosion model. These process geomorphologists soon realized some of their observations were at odds with Davis's model. Other geomorphologists turned away from the cycle of erosion to work instead on climatic or tectonic geomorphology.

The model spread fast. In 1901 Hans Reusch was using it to explain the undulating plateau of southern Norway. Very much influenced by Davis Walter Wråk moved to study the relief of the northern Scandinavian Mountains, describing among other things the Borsu surface. The first study of China's topography using the model was published in 1907 by B. Willis and co-workers. The idea of the cycle of erosion was disseminated among college and university students with a series of textbooks published in the 1890s and 1900s. According to Sheldon Judson up to Second World War reports on regional geology tended to include brief mentions of the local cycle of erosion and of peneplanization.

While the model was at first widely accepted among Anglo-Saxon scholars, in Continental Europe it met some resistance with German scholars Albrecht and Walther Penck, Siegfried Passarge and Alfred Hettner standing out as early opponents to the model. Despite Davis's efforts, which included translating his work into German, being a visiting professor at Berlin and touring much of Europe, the cycle of erosion never did take firm root in Germany. Walther Penck came to originate an alternative model with its own set of tenets. Walther's ideas were published posthumously in 1924 by his father, Albrecht. In Walther's model, relief is shaped as a function of the denudation/uplift rate. Davis, a friend of Walther's father, was critical of Walther's new model. Davis's review of Walther Penck's second publication on the subject left a distorted view of Penck's ideas among later workers. This is because Davis misunderstood and mis-translated parts of the paper, therefore Davis is not an adequate critic of Penck's work.

In France the cycle of erosion theory was first spread by Albert de Lapparent. In general its reception in France was mixed with Émile Haug giving it limited attention and Paul Vidal de La Blache adopting it without reservations. Other notable French geographers influenced by Davis ideas on the cycle of erosion are Emmanuel de Martonne and Henri Baulig. Geomorphology in France developed into two schools, one based on geographers who adopted Davisian thought and another based on engineering geology with connections to hydraulics and mining.

=== Intensified criticism (1945–1974) ===
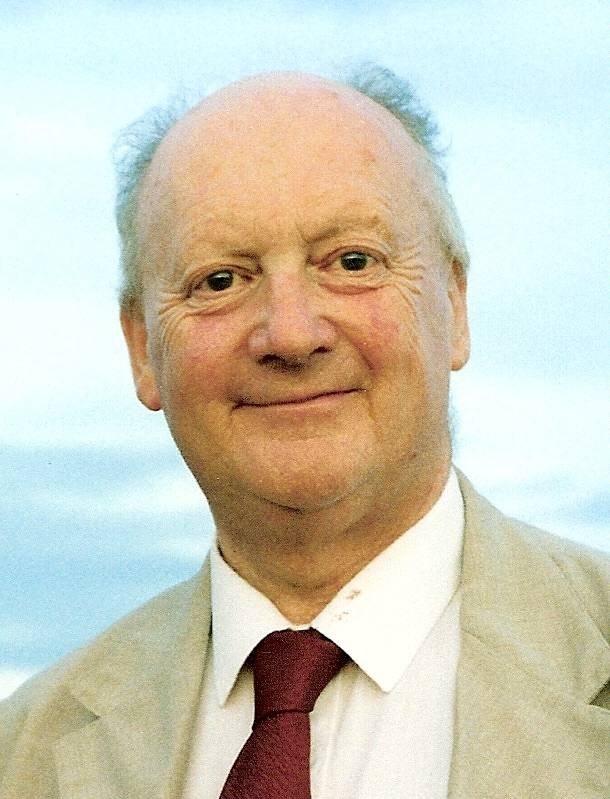
Richard Chorley (1927–2002), a geomorphologist known for his criticism of the cycle of erosion. In Cliff Ollier's words "'Davis bashing' was a theme" for him.

In 1960 geomorphologist Sheldon Judson noted that American geographers had largely abandoned the concept and moved to study landscape and landforms from a process and statistical point of view. Eiju Yatsu opined, however, that despite the intention of many geomorphologists to abandon Davisian ideas after the Second World War, many ended up returning to them with some modifications.

An alternative cycle theory was proposed by Lester Charles King in the 1960s. While King's ideas were an attempt at refuting Davis's cycle of erosion they were themselves of cyclical nature and contributed to ushering in a wave of criticism in 1960s against both his and Davis's models. This criticism has been called "Davis bashing" by Cliff Ollier and constitutes to Ollier the ridicule of cyclical theories in geomorphology without any alternative model being proposed. Since Davis' ideas were being discredited other areas of research, like that of climatic geomorphology, were attacked by their perceived association to it.

The notions of time, uplift, slope and drainage density evolution in the erosion cycle have been criticized. Further the validity of some whole concepts associated with the cycle of erosion have been questioned including stream grade, slope decline, (Note: King argued that in scarps and tablelands slope decline was "either non-existent or impotent".) base level and most of all that of peneplains. (Note: Lester Charles King, who coined the competing concept of pediplains, wrote: A peneplain in the Davisian sense, resulting from slope reduction and downwearing, does not exist in nature. It should be redefined as "an imaginary landform.")

Writing in 1971 geomorphologist Ronald Flemal summarized the situation as follows:

Currently geomorphologists are divided into three camps: those who still adhere to Davisian concepts, either in the original or a modified form; those who desire to replace Davisian ideas by a different cyclic erosional model; and those who reject cyclic erosion completely.

=== Modern status ===
Despite considerable criticism the cycle of erosion model has remained part of the science of geomorphology. The model or theory has never been proved wrong, but neither has it been proven. The inherent difficulties of the model have instead made geomorphological research to advance along other lines. In contrast to its disputed status in geomorphology, the cycle of erosion model is a common approach used to establish denudation chronologies, and is thus an important concept in the science of historical geology. While acknowledging its shortcomings modern geomorphologists Andrew Goudie and Karna Lidmar-Bergström have praised it for its elegance and pedagogical value respectively. Writing in 2007 Anthony Orme evaluates that:

"stripped of its evolutionary baggage, the Davisian Cycle of Erosion had merit as an interpretive exercise, and indeed still has merit as an end-member in a range of possible temporal scenarios for Earth’s surface development."

== See also ==
- Epigenetic valley
- Fluvial landforms
- Rejuvenation (river)

== Sources ==
- Don J. Easterbrook (1999), Surface Processes and Landforms; Second Edition; Chapter Six
- Chorley, Richard J.; Beckinsale, Robert P.; Dunn, Antony J. (2005) [1973]. "Chapter Twenty-Two". The History of the Study of Landforms. Vol. Two. Taylor & Francis e-Library.
- Johnson, Douglas Wilson (1919). Shore Processes and Shoreline Development. New York: John Wiley & Sons.
