= Paleic surface =

Erosion surface in Southern Norway

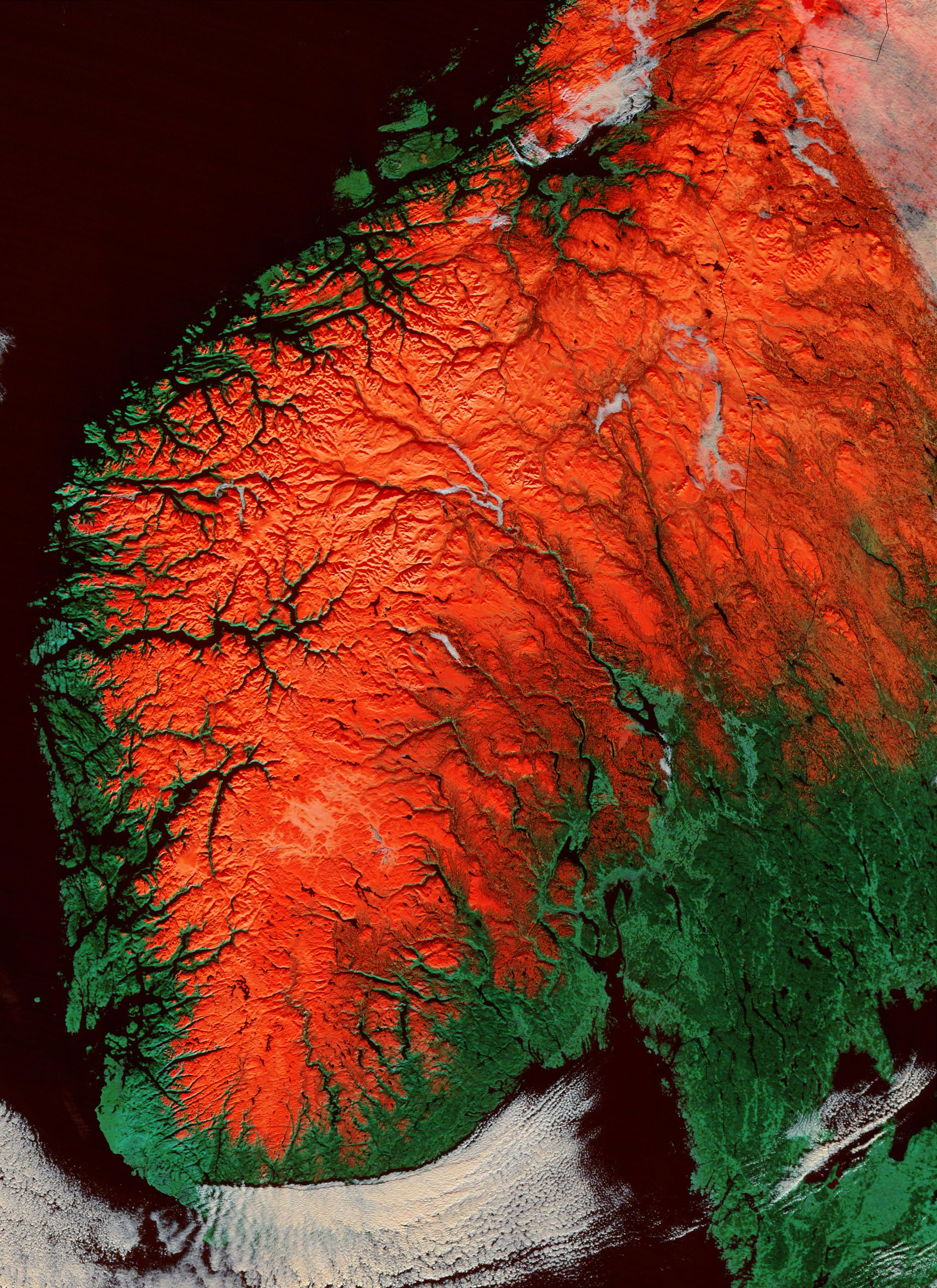
Satellite image of southern Norway, higher areas shown in as red. If studied carefully zones of gentle slopes and flat terrain can be discerned in the uplands. These make up the paleic surface.

The paleic surface or palaeic surface (Norwegian: paleiske overflaten, from Ancient Greek palaios 'old') is an erosion surface of gentle slopes that exist in South Norway. Parts of it are a continuation of the Sub-Cambrian peneplain and Muddus Plains found further east or equivalent to the strandflat coastal plains of Norway. Hardangervidda, a particularly flat and elevated part of the Paleic surface formed in the Miocene at sea level.

Although the tilted plateau-like topography of south Norway had been noted since the early 1800s, the first formal description was by Hans Reusch in 1901, using a denudation chronology approach invoking several of W.M. Davis’ ideas of a cycle of erosion. Reusch also coined the name Paleic surface.

The Paleic surface is sometimes erroneously considered equal to Norway's "pre-glacial surface" – the surface that existed in Norway just before the Quaternary glaciations.

== South Norway: the type area ==
There have been various attempts at defining the subset of surfaces that compose the paleic surface in southern Norway. Geomorphologist Karna Lidmar-Bergström and co-workers recognize five widespread stepped surfaces. (Note: The disposition of the relief in steps is held as argument against a glacial buzzsaw origin of the subdued relief.) However, not all steps can be fitted into the five-step scheme, perhaps due to local doming. On eastern Norway some of the stepped surfaces merge into a single surface. In south-western Norway the Paleic surface is strongly dissected by valleys and fjords. Dovre and Jotunheimen are residual mountains rising from the highest of the stepped surfaces. These mountains define a former envelope surface that is warped. Possibly the warping of the envelope surface reflects doming of the crust associated with the uplift of the Scandinavian Mountains in the Cenozoic. The Paleic surface has been reconstructed over the fjord area of western Norway. In the reconstructed paleic surface, very gentle valleys follow the same course as Sognefjord, Hardangerfjord, Gudbrandsdalen and Østerdalen, but not of other valleys and fjords of western Norway.

To the north the lower levels of the Paleic surface are considered to be equivalent to the Muddus plains in northern Sweden, meaning that topography is likely to have developed at the same time and level, and by the same processes.

The lower levels of the Paleic surface are thought to have been formed by etching and stripping and pediplanation. The climate under which these processes occurred was likely warmer than the present.

=== Tectonics and erosion ===
Much of the paleic surface in southern Norway was at sea level or below during the Miocene. In the Early Pliocene (5–4 million years ago) the surfaces such as Hardangervidda were uplifted by tectonic forces 1.2 km. The peneplain surfaces of the paleic surface are apparently disrupted by vertical displacement along faults, following an NNE-SSW orientation.

The coastal plains of Norway, the strandflat, are likely old surfaces comparable to the paleic surface that escaped the uplift that affected the Scandinavian Mountains. Since the paleic surface formed river and glacier erosion has eroded much of it in Western Norway, but scattered remnants are ubiquitous.

== Paleic surfaces elsewhere in Norway ==
In northern Norway a paleic surface extends in Varanger Peninsula. In the peninsula the paleic surface is made up of an undulating plateau between the altitudes of 200 and 600 m.a.s.l. The higher parts of the undulating plateau are made up by erosion-resistant rocks like quartzite. The lower parts are made up by weak rocks like shale and mudstone. At intermediate levels sandstone is common. Some parts of the paleic surface in Varanger Peninsula are a re-exposed unconformity that underlie sedimentary rock of Vendian (Late Neoproterozoic) age. The paleic surface might have been uplifted as much as 200–250 meters since middle Pliocene times.

Parts of the continental shelf of Norway corresponds to paleic surfaces called bankflats. These surfaces bounds landward with submarine slopes that separates them from the strandflat.

== See also ==
- South Småland peneplain
