= Lester Charles King =

English geologist and geomorphologist

Lester King
- Born: 1907; Wimbledon, London, United Kingdom
- Died: 1989 (aged 81–82); Durban, South Africa
- Citizenship: United Kingdom
- Education: Victoria University of Wellington (M.Sc.); University of South Africa (Ph.D.); University of New Zealand (D.Sc.)
- Known for: African Surface; Pediplain; Scarp retreat Cymatogeny
- Awards: Patron's Medal
- Scientific career
- Fields: Geomorphology
- Workplaces: Natal University College; University of Natal

Lester Charles King (1907–1989) was an English geologist and geomorphologist known for his theories on scarp retreat. He offered a very different view of the origin of continental landscaping than that of William Morris Davis. Studying at university in New Zealand King was a disciple of Charles Cotton who was heavily influenced by Davis. While King's ideas were an attempt at refuting Davis' cycle of erosion they were themselves of cyclical nature and contributed to what Cliff Ollier has called "Davis bashing" — the ridicule of cyclical theories in geomorphology, in particular Davis' ones. Critics did however not propose alternative models. For him, the weathering of physical factors in arid areas causes the erosion of the hills, the deposition of the weathered material (pediments) and the deposition of these material in lower altitudes, contributing to the formation of the pediplain. He was also an early proponent of continental drift, having lectured on this matter at a number of U.S. universities during a tour in 1958.

King was a supporter of the Expanding Earth hypothesis.
