= William M. Davis House =

Historic house in Massachusetts, United States

- William Morris Davis House
- U.S. National Register of Historic Places
- U.S. National Historic Landmark
- U.S. Historic district – Contributing property
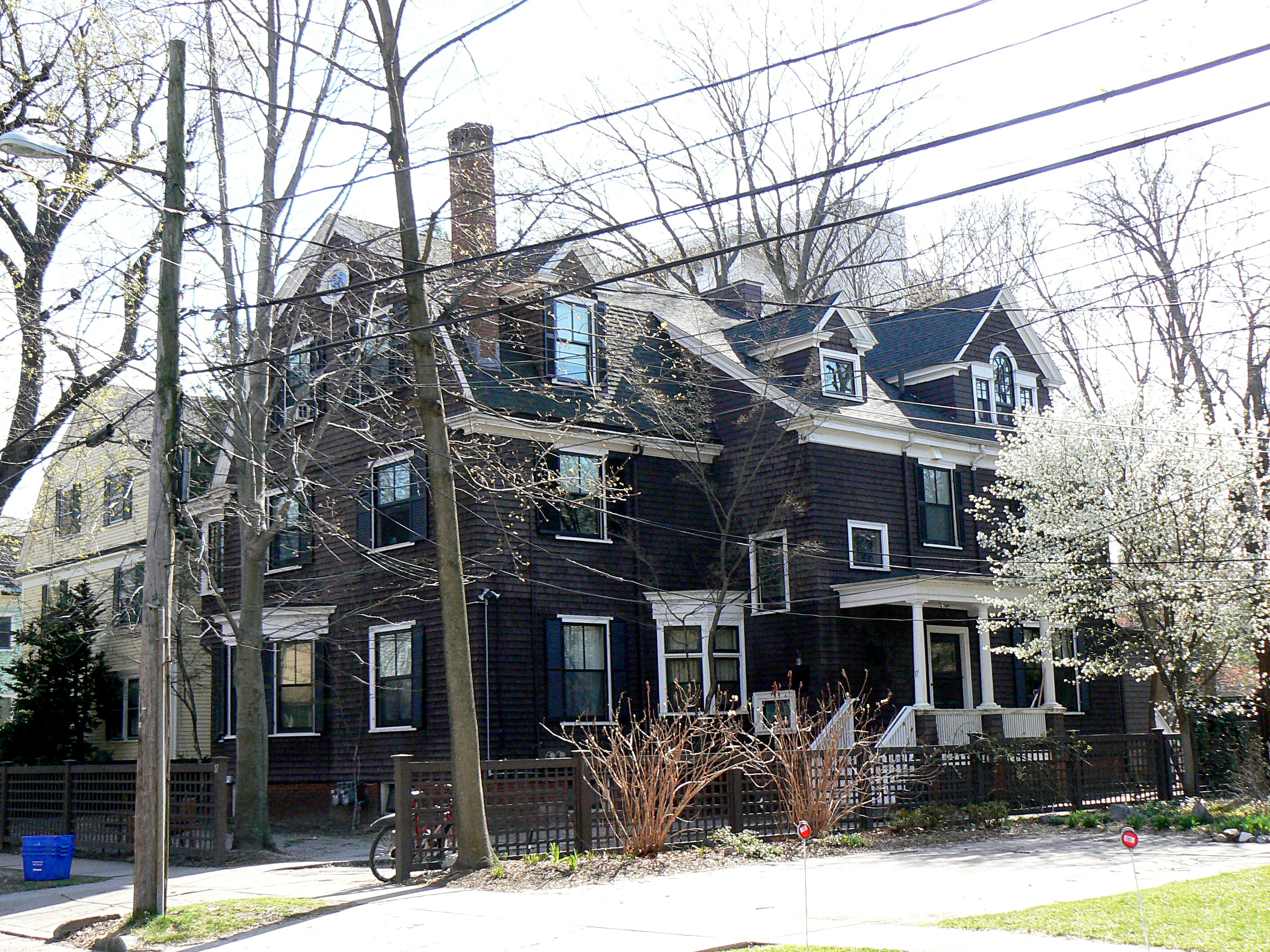

- Location within Massachusetts Location within the United States
- Location: 17 Francis Avenue Cambridge, Massachusetts
- Coordinates: 42°22′42.3″N 71°6′44.0″W
- Area: less than one acre
- Built: pre 1898
- Architect: C Herbert McClare
- Architectural style: Queen Anne
- Part of: Shady Hill Historic District (ID86001680)
- NRHP reference No.: 76000306

Significant dates
- Added to NRHP: January 7, 1976
- Designated NHL: January 7, 1976
- Designated CP: May 19, 1986

The William Morris Davis House is a National Historic Landmark on 17 Francis Avenue in Cambridge, Massachusetts. An architecturally undistinguished Queen Anne-era house, probably built in the 1890s, it is notable as the home of William Morris Davis between 1898 and 1916. Davis (1850-1934) was a professor of geology at Harvard University, and an influential figure in the development of meteorology and geomorphology as scientific disciplines. His textbook Elementary Meteorology was a standard of that field for many years. The house was declared a National Historic Landmark in 1976.

== Description and history ==
The Davis House is a 2 1/2-story wood-frame house with irregular massing. The main block is roughly square, and has a gable roof, but there is a large ell of matching height in front of it which has a gambrel roof. The main entrance is on the side, under a porch supported by round columns resting on shingled piers, with a simple balustrade in between. The front of the house has a single-story polygonal bay, and an oriel window at the top of the gambreled gable. The exterior is clad in shingles. The building is architecturally undistinguished, and is classified by local historians as a Queen Anne-Shingle style structure. Based on the architectural and stylistic evidence, its construction date is estimated to be in the 1890s.

William Morris Davis (1850-1934) purchased this house around 1898, the date of his appointment as the Sturgis Hooper Professor of Geology at nearby Harvard University, and lived here until 1916. Davis had studied geology under Nathaniel S. Shaler at Harvard in the 1870s, and was offered a teaching position there in 1878. In 1894 he published Elementary Meteorology, a textbook that was the first to unite and organize a previously uncoordinated body of knowledge in that field. Davis' most profound contribution to scientific knowledge came in his publication in 1912 of a treatise entitled A Reasoned Description of Landforms, in which he provided a template for outlining the genesis, development, and classification of landforms on a global scale. In later publications he described the erosion cycle and other important concepts in understanding the development and lifecycle of landforms. Davis was recognized by his peers in the scientific community with numerous awards and recognition.

== See also ==
- List of National Historic Landmarks in Massachusetts
- National Register of Historic Places listings in Cambridge, Massachusetts
