= Nile Basin =

Part of Africa drained by the Nile River and its tributaries

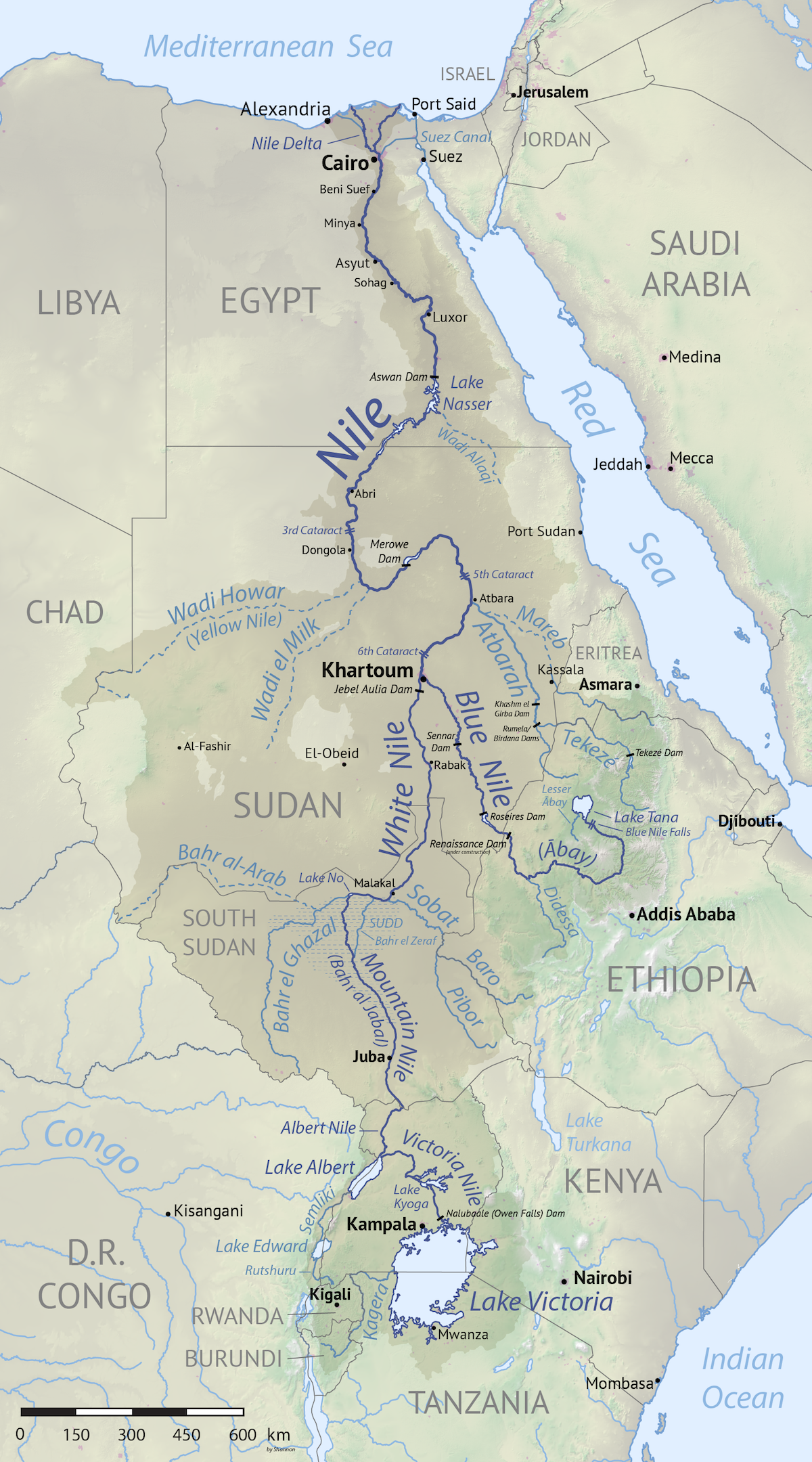
The Nile Basin

The Nile Basin is the part of Africa drained by the Nile River and its tributaries.

Besides being the second largest hydrographic basin in Africa, the Nile Basin is effectively the most notable drainage basin on the continent. It covers 3,112,369 km^{2}, or about 10% of African territory, crossing arid regions and with a high population density. The Nile Basin Initiative (NBI) has been in existence since 1999, with the aim of strengthening cooperation in sharing its resources concerned.

The drainage area of the basin covers Burundi, Chad, the Democratic Republic of the Congo, Egypt, Eritrea, Ethiopia, Kenya, Rwanda, South Sudan, the Sudan, Tanzania, and Uganda. The Basin is the main supplier of fresh water, electricity, and fish for the local residents of these countries, supporting about 270 million inhabitants, or 20% of the African population. The basin rises in the highlands and flows in extremely arid regions, in particular the Sahara Desert.

Its main navigable course is through the Nile River, beginning at the mouth section where it meets the Mediterranean Sea (more precisely after the Nile Delta), up until it reaches the city of Aswan, in southern Egypt. There are also navigable courses around the Aswan Dam. In the middle Nile, upriver from the dam, due to the presence of waterfalls north of Khartoum (Sudan), the river is navigable in just three stretches. The first is from the Egypt–Sudan border to the southern tip of Lake Nasser. The second is the section between the third and fourth cataracts. The third and most important stretch extends from Khartoum, in the south, to Juba (South Sudan).

The main water supplier for the basin is Lake Victoria, located in the Great Rift Valley. About 238 million people live within the Nile basin, with about 172 million of those being inhabitants of rural localities.

In the southwestern part of the basin in South Sudan near the watershed of the Congo Basin, relief is made up of a single large pediplain. Heights that rise above this pediplain contain laterite soils, sometimes with pisolites or ferricrete, and are remnants of an older surface. Some of the summits corresponding to the said old surface were formed by relief inversion of valleys.
