= Richard Chorley =

English geographer (1927–2002)

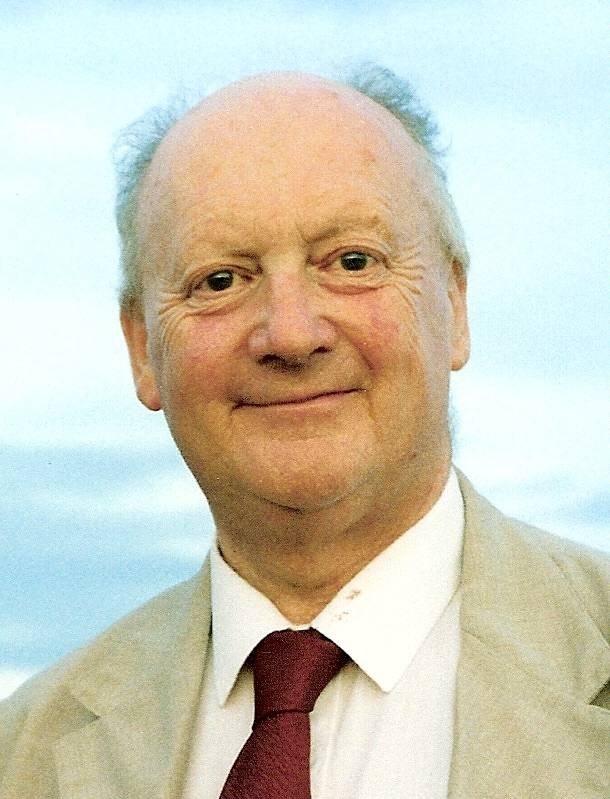
- Born: Richard John Chorley; 4 September 1927; Minehead, Somerset, England
- Died: 12 May 2002 (aged 74); Cambridge, Cambridgeshire, England
- Scientific career
- Fields: Geomorphology, quantitative geography
- Doctoral students: David Harvey

Richard John Chorley (4 September 1927 – 12 May 2002) was an English geographer, and professor of geography at Cambridge University, known as leading figure in quantitative geography in the late 20th century, who played an instrumental role in bringing in the use of systems theory to geography.

== Biography ==
=== Early education ===
Chorley was born in Minehead, Somerset in an area known as the West Country, with roots in Exmoor and the Vale of Taunton Deane. He was a product of a local primary school and Minehead Grammar School. Later on, Chorley began studying Geomorphology as an undergraduate at the School of Geography at Oxford. He served with the Royal Engineers from 1946 to 1948 and made it Lieutenant. Afterwards he went up to Exeter College, where he obtained his BA with Honours in 1951. Later in 1954 he also obtained his MA at Oxford University, and in 1974 his Sc.D. at Cambridge University.

At Oxford he was greatly influenced by R.P. Beckinsale, who advised Chorley to go on to graduate study in the United States. He made a transatlantic move in 1951 as a Fulbright Scholar to Columbia University where he was a graduate student in the Geology Department and explored the quantitative approach to land form evolution.

=== Career development ===
Chorley started his academic career as instructor in geography at Columbia University, New York in 1952. In 1954 he moved to Brown University, Providence, USA, where he was appointed Instructor in Geology. In 1957, Chorley needed to return to Britain for family reasons. In 1958 he was appointed a Demonstrator at Cambridge University and proceeded to move rapidly up the university hierarchy with a readership in 1970 and ad hominem chair in 1974.

During his career Chorley published few geomorphology studies; among them one about comparative morphometry in 1962 and a review papper dealing with the methods of Strahler and Horton in 1966. In the opinion of Eiju Yatsu, Chorley was more of a science philosopher than a geomorphologist.

From 1963 to 1978 he also co-directed the Madingley Geography Conferences. In 1964 was appointed British representative to the Commission on Quantitative Techniques of the International Geographical Union, where he was nominated chairman in 1968. In the same year he was also appointed Chairman of the Committee on the Role of Models and Quantitative techniques in Geographical Teaching of the Geographical Association.

At Cambridge University from 1970 to 1975 Chorley served as Secretary of the Faculty Board of Geography and Geology. In 1972 he was appointed Deputy Head of the Department of Geography, Cambridge University, for the Lent and Michaelmas terms, and from 1984 to 1989 he was Head of the Department of Geography, Cambridge University. In 1990 he was elected Vice-Master, Sidney Sussex College, Cambridge University.

=== Awards and honours ===
Chorley received a series of Awards and honours, such as:

- 1967 Awarded the Gill Memorial of the Royal Geographical Society for contributions to Physical Geography and quantitative studies.
- 1974 Elected first honorary life member of the British Geomorphological Research Group.
- 1981 Honors Award, Association of American Geographers
- 1987 Awarded the Patron's Medal of the Royal Geographical Society
- 1988 Elected an Honorary Member of the Italian Geographical Society
- 1988 Elected to the Council of the Royal Geographical Society

=== Death ===
Chorley died at Addenbrooke's Hospital, Cambridge, on 12 May 2002 following a heart attack and was buried in Cambridge's Ascension Parish Burial Ground on the 21st; he was survived by his wife, Rosemary, and their two children.

He is buried at the Parish of the Ascension Burial Ground in Cambridge. He married Rosemary More in 1965 and they had one son and one daughter.

== Work ==
=== Physical geography at Cambridge ===
Cambridge had provided the launching pad for Chorley's revolutionary ideas. He rejected the prevailing paradigm of the Davisian cycles of erosion and sought to replace these with a quantitative model-based paradigm with an emphasis on General Systems Theory and numerical modelling. Richard Chorley's negative assessment of Davis theories led Cliff Ollier to state that "'Davis bashing' was a theme" for Chorley.

Cambridge contained a strong group in physical geography with colleagues that encouraged Chorley's ideas. It also provided a good environment for him to conduct his experiments. Chorley produced volumes of scientific papers in physical geography that codified his approach and allowed him to ask new questions about earth surface processes and ways they can be studied. Central to these was the concept of system dynamics, and his production of Physical Geography: A Systems Approach (1971) and Environmental Systems (1978) that influenced a generation of scholars.

Chorley's studies ranged into climatology and hydrology where he cooperated with Colorado meteorologist Roger Barry on the text, Atmosphere, Weather and Climate (1968). Many of his writings were jointly authored or edited, including Water, Earth and Man (1969). In addition, Chorley launched in 1964 the first of a series of text on The History of the Study of Landforms. Two further volumes were published in 1973 and 1991. At the time of Chorley's death, Volume 4 was nearing completion.

=== Progress in Geography ===
Instead of confining himself to physical geography, Chorley took a broad approach to change in geography as a whole. He did this first through a series of annual summer conferences held at Madingley Hall near Cambridge, where his lectures helped form a basis of a series of volumes (notably Models in Geography, 1967) that influenced the discipline.

The second was by founding an annual series, "Progress in Geography", later converted into two influential quarterly journals, in which changes over the whole discipline could be recorded and assessed.

== Selected publications ==
- Chorley, Richard J. Geomorphology and general systems theory. Washington, DC: US Government Printing Office, 1962.
- Chorley, Richard J., and Peter Haggett, eds. Socio-economic models in geography. Vol. 249. Methuen, 1968.
- Haggett, Peter, and Richard J. Chorley. Network analysis in geography. Vol. 67. London: Edward Arnold, 1969.
- Chorley, Richard J., and Barbara A. Kennedy. Physical geography: a systems approach. London: Prentice-Hall, 1971.
- Barry, Roger G., and Richard J. Chorley. Atmosphere, weather and climate. Routledge, 1992, 2009.
