= Sten Rudberg =

Swedish geologist and geomorphologist

- Born: 13 September 1917; Uppsala
- Died: 22 October 1996 (aged 79)
- Citizenship: Sweden
- Education: Uppsala University
- Known for: Studies on the relief of Scandinavia
- Scientific career
- Fields: Denudation chronology Geomorphology
- Workplaces: Uppsala University; Geological Survey of Sweden; University of Gothenburg

Sten Rudberg (13 September 1917 – 22 October 1996) was a Swedish geologist and geomorphologist. He was the son of Gunnar Rudberg. Sten Rudberg was appointed chair professor of the University of Gothenburg in 1958 after incumbent professor Karl-Erik Bergsten moved to Lund University. In 1959 Rudberg was elected into the Royal Society of Sciences and Letters in Gothenburg. Subsequently, in 1961 Rudberg's professorship was transformed into a professorship in Physical geography. In 1964 Rudberg went to head the department of Physical geography after the Geography department of the University of Gothenburg was dissolved and Human geography formed its own department. Rudberg remained professor in Gothenburg until 1984.

Rudbergs Ph.D. thesis dealt with the large-scale geomorphology and denudation chronology of Västerbotten in northern Sweden, he subsequently continued to work on large scale geomorphology of Scandinavia while also making scientific contributions dealing with wind erosion, cliff retreat, and periglacial mass movements. While working with large-scale geomorphology Rudberg was not concerned with tectonics.

From 1968 to 1978 Rudberg served as editor-in-chief of Geografiska Annaler, Series A – Physical Geography, steering the journal through its transition to fully English-language publication and expanding its scope to include periglacial geomorphology and Quaternary geochronology. In recognition of his editorial and research contributions he was awarded the Vega Medal of the Swedish Society for Anthropology and Geography in 1985—the highest Swedish honour in geography—and later elected an honorary member of the Nordic Geomorphological Union.
