= Glacial buzzsaw =

The glacial buzzsaw is a hypothesis claiming erosion by warm-based glaciers is key to limit the height of mountains above certain threshold altitude. To this the hypothesis adds that great mountain massifs are leveled towards the equilibrium line altitude (ELA), which would act as a “climatic base level”. Starting from the hypothesis it has been predicted that local climate restricts the maximum height that mountain massifs can attain by effect of uplifting tectonic forces. It follows that as local climate is cooler at higher latitudes the highest mountains are lower there compared to the tropics where glaciation is and has been more limited. The mechanism behind the glacial buzzsaw effect would be the erosion of small glaciers that are mostly unable to erode much below the equilibrium line altitude since they do not reach these altitudes because of increased ablation. Instead, large valley glaciers may easily surpass the equilibrium line altitude and do therefore not contribute to a glacial buzzsaw effect. This is said to be the case of the Patagonian ice fields where lack of buzzsaw effect results in rapid tectonic uplift rates.

Mountains massifs proposed to be subject to a glacial buzzsaw effect include the mountains of southeast Alaska, the Teton Range of Wyoming and the Dauphiné Alps of France. Authors such as Egholm and co-workers have claimed that the glacial buzzsaw effect can explain mountain altitudes across the globe. Some of the mountain massifs experiencing the highest uplift rates are those for which glacial buzzsaw effects are discarded.

The concept has been criticized, as measured erosion rates (Note: Erosion rates can be estimated knowing the ages of surfaces. These ages are in turn estimated from cosmogenic nuclides ^{10}Be and ^{26}Al concentrations in rock material.) in the Pyrenees do not indicate a general drive towards any certain level. In the case of Norway the elevated paleic surface has been proposed to have been shaped by a glacial buzzsaw effect. However this proposal is difficult to reconcile with the fact that the paleic surface consist of a series of steps at different levels. Further glacial cirques, that in the buzzsaw hypothesis contribute to belevel the landscape, are not associated to any paleosurface levels of the composite paleic surface, nor does the modern ELA or the Last Glacial Maximum ELA match any given level of the paleic surface. The elevated plains of West Greenland are also unrelated to any glacial buzzsaw effect.

== See also ==
- Climatic geomorphology
- Cryoplanation
- Summit accordance
- Truncated upland
