= Peneplain =

Low-relief plain formed by protracted erosion

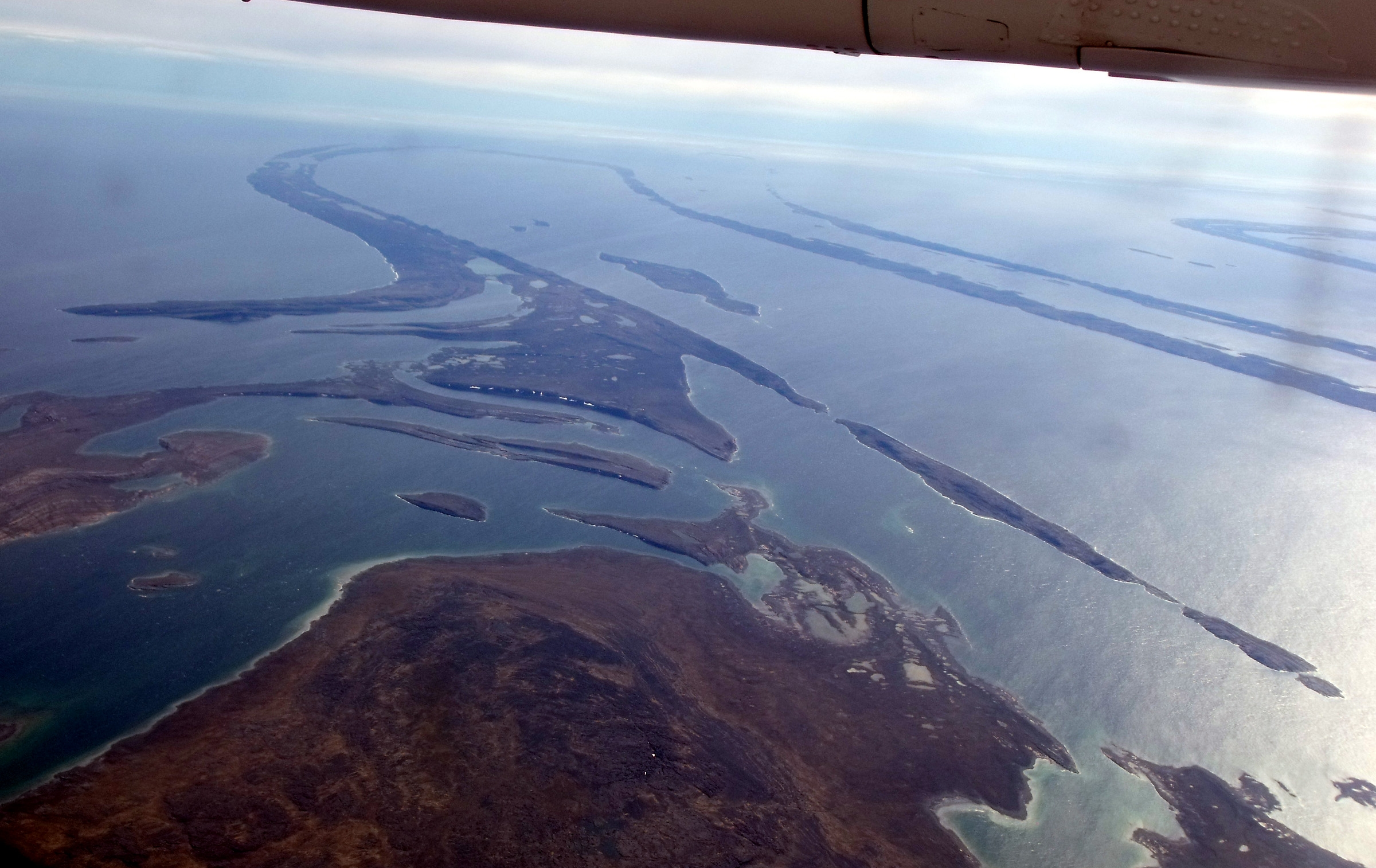
Aerial view of the almost flat and drowned peneplain at Belcher Islands, Hudson Bay, Canada, cutting across numerous geologic folds.

In geomorphology and geology, a peneplain is a low-relief plain formed by protracted erosion. This is the definition in the broadest of terms, albeit with frequency the usage of peneplain is meant to imply the representation of a near-final (or penultimate) stage of fluvial erosion during times of extended tectonic stability. Peneplains are sometimes associated with the cycle of erosion theory of William Morris Davis, (Note: The term was coined around 1900 by William Morris Davis who described it as follows: Given sufficient time for the action of denuding forces on a mass of land standing fixed with reference to a constant base-level, and it must be worn down so low and so smooth, that it would fully deserve the name of a plain. But it is very unusual for a mass of land to maintain a fixed position as long as is here assumed.... I have therefore elsewhere suggested that an old region, nearly base-levelled, should be called an almost-plain; that is a peneplain.) but Davis and other researchers have also used the term in a purely descriptive manner without any theory or particular genesis attached.

== Discussion ==
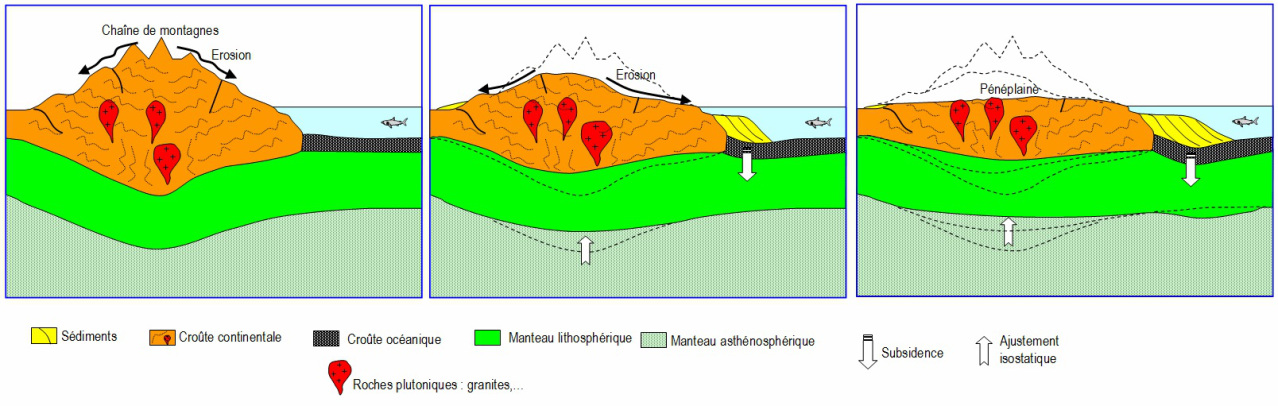
Sketch of a hypothetical peneplain formation after an orogeny.

The existence of some peneplains, and peneplanation as a process in nature, is not without controversy, due to a lack of contemporary examples and uncertainty in identifying relic examples. By some definitions, peneplains grade down to a base level represented by sea level, yet in other definitions such a condition is ignored. Geomorphologist Karna Lidmar-Bergström and co-workers consider the base level criterion crucial and above the precise mechanism of formation of peneplains, including this way some pediplains among peneplains.

While peneplains are usually assumed to form near sea level it has also been posited that peneplains can form at height if extensive sedimentation raises the local base level sufficiently or if river networks are continuously obstructed by tectonic deformation. The peneplains of the Pyrenees and Tibetan Plateau may exemplify these two cases respectively.

A common misconception about peneplains is that they ought to be so plain they are featureless. In fact, some peneplains may be hilly as they reflect irregular deep weathering, forming a plain grading to a base level only at a grand-scale. (Note: Example of this are the Sub-Mesozoic hilly peneplains of southern Sweden.)

At the grand-scale peneplains are characterized by appearing to be sculpted in rock with disregard of rock structure and lithology, but in detail, their shape is structurally controlled, for example, drainage divides in peneplain can follow more resistant rock. In the view of Davis large streams do become insensitive to lithology and structure, which they were not during the valley phase of erosion cycle. This may explain the existence of superimposed streams.

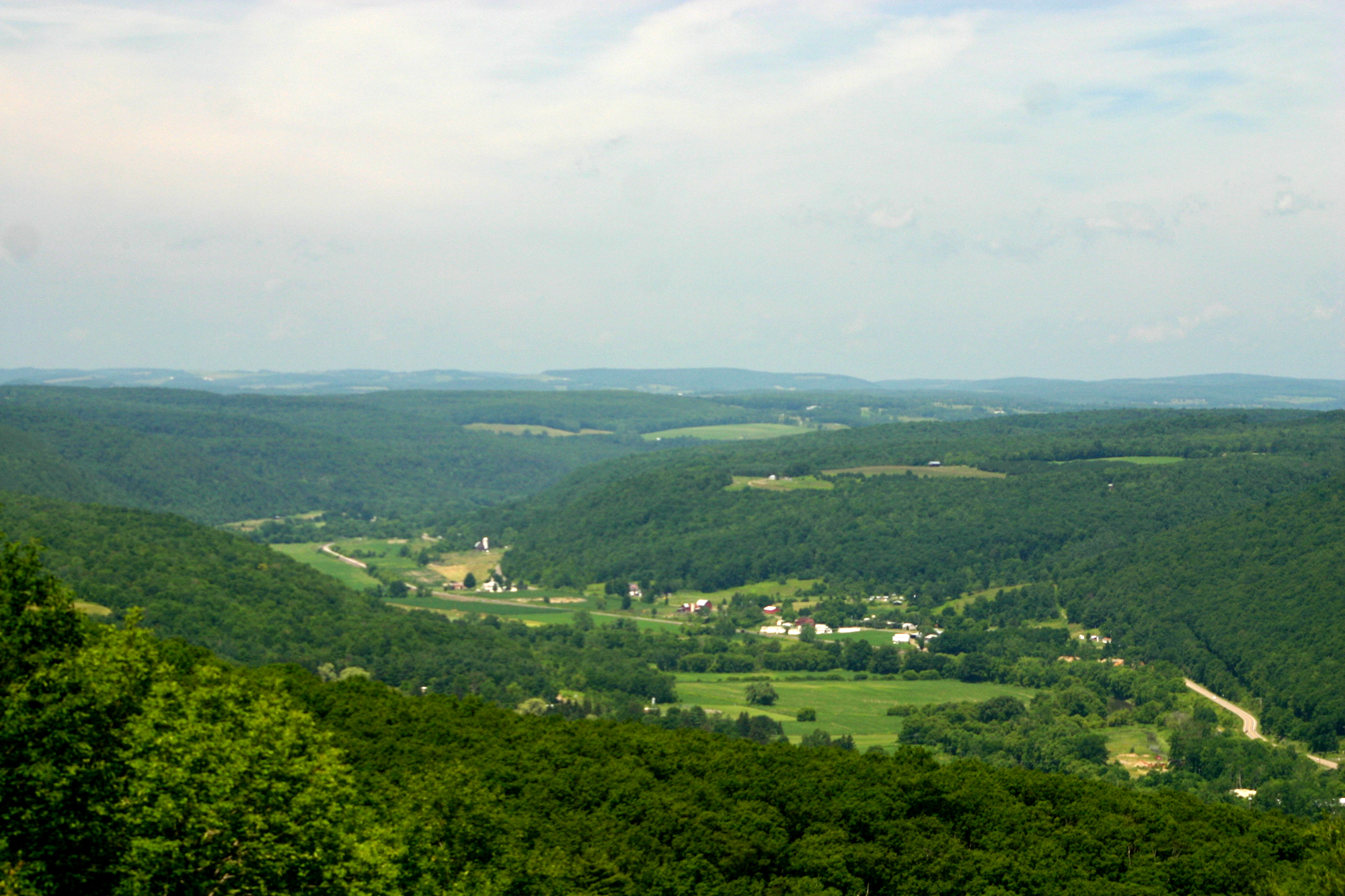
Canisteo River Valley from Pinnacle State Park, New York. The distant peaks at the same elevation represent the remnants of a peneplain that was uplifted to form the Allegheny Plateau, which is a dissected plateau in southwestern New York. In this area, the sharp relief that is seen on some of the Allegheny Plateau has been rounded by glaciation.

== Types of peneplains ==
There are various terms for landforms that are either alternatives to classical peneplains, a sub-set of peneplains or partially overlap with the term. The last is the case of planation surfaces that may be peneplains or not, while some peneplains are not planation surfaces.

In their 2013 work Green, Lidmar-Bergström and co-workers provide the following classification scheme for peneplains:

1. Planation surfaces
  1. Pediplain
  2. Inselberg plain
  3. Etchplain
2. Hilly relief
  1. Etched hilly relief

Rhodes Fairbridge and Charles Finkl argue that peneplains are often of mixed origin (polygenetic), as they may have been shaped by etchplanation during periods of humid climate and pediplanation during periods of arid and semi-arid climate. The long time spans under which some peneplains evolve ensures varied climatic influences. The same authors do also list marine abrasion (Note: Coastal geomorphologist Douglas Wilson Johnson has proposed to use the term "peneplane" instead of "peneplain" when a planation surface is thought to be of marine origin.) and glacial erosion among processes that can contribute in shaping peneplains.

In addition, epigene peneplains can be distinguished from exhumed peneplains. Epigene peneplains are those that have never been buried or covered by sedimentary rock. Exhumed peneplains are those that are re-exposed after having been buried in sediments.

The oldest identifiable peneplain in a region is known as a primary peneplain. (Note: Akin to what in German scientific literature is known as a Primärrumpf.) An example of a primary peneplain is the Sub-Cambrian peneplain in southern Sweden.

=== Pediplains ===
The peneplain concept is often juxtaposed to that of pediplain. However authors like Karna Lidmar-Bergström classify pediplains as a type of peneplain. On the contrary Lester Charles King held them as incompatible landforms arguing that peneplains do not exist. King wrote:

A peneplain in the Davisian sense, resulting from slope reduction and downwearing, does not exist in nature. It should be redefined as "an imaginary landform."

According to King the difference between pediplains and Davis’ peneplains is in the history and processes behind their formation, and less so in the final shape. A difference in form that may be present is that of residual hills, which in Davis’ peneplains are to have gentle slopes, while in pediplains they ought to have the same steepness as the slopes in the early stages of erosion leading to pediplanation. Given that the coalesced pediments of the pediplains form a series of very gentle concave slopes, a difference with Davis' understanding of peneplains may lie in the fact that his idealized peneplains had very gentle convex slopes instead. However, Davis' views on the subject are not fully clear. Contrary to this view Rhodes Fairbridge and Charles Finkl argue that the precise mechanism of formation (pediplanation, etc.) is irrelevant and that the term peneplain has been used and can be used in a purely descriptive manner. Further, alternation of processes with varying climate, relative sea level and biota make old surfaces unlikely to be of a single origin.

== Preservation and destruction of peneplains ==
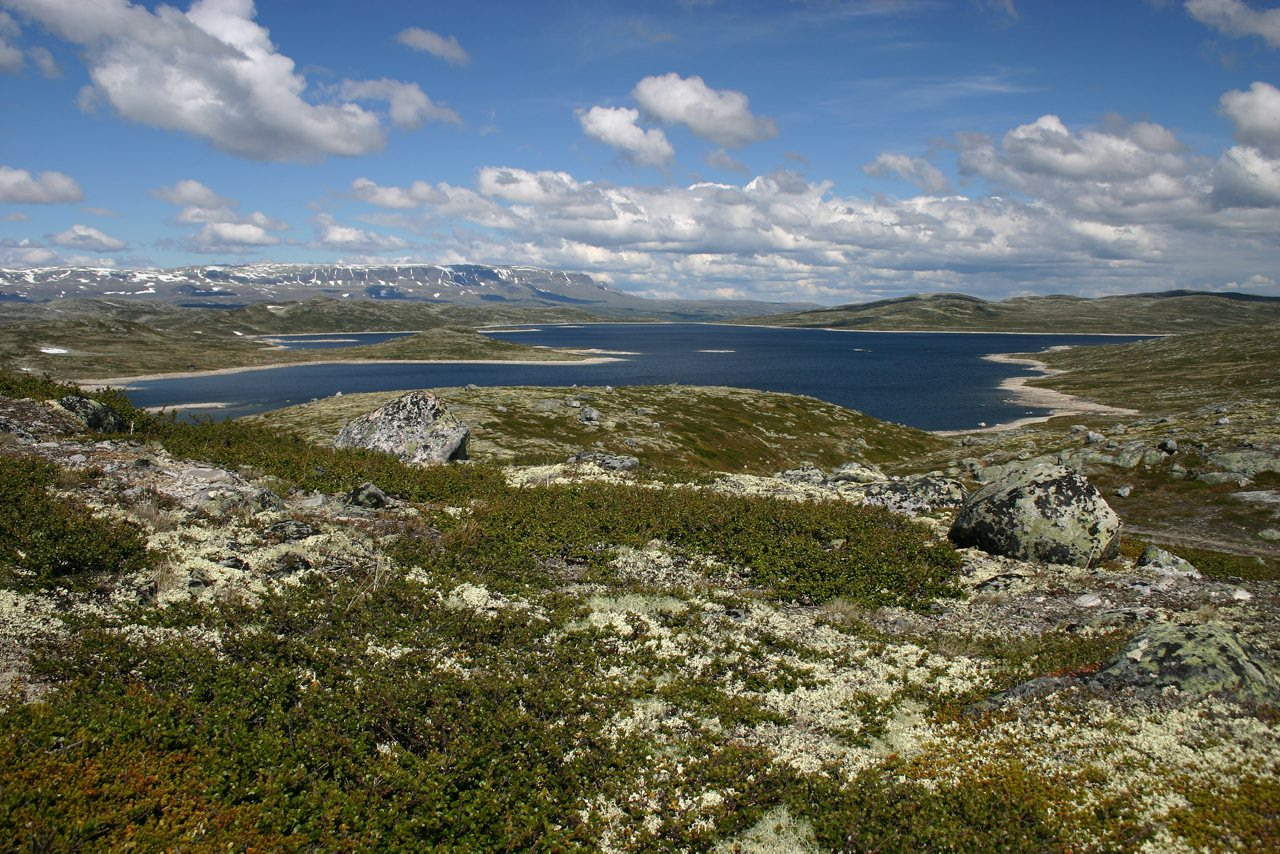
The Hardangervidda plateau in southern Norway is a peneplain formed in the Miocene epoch and then uplifted to its present altitude of 1200 m a.s.l.

Peneplains that are detached from their base level are identified by either hosting an accumulation of sediments that buries it or by being in an uplifted position. Burial preserves the peneplain. Any exposed peneplain detached from its baselevel can be considered a paleosurface or paleoplain. Uplift of a peneplain commonly results in renewed erosion. As Davis put it in 1885:

"the decrepit surface must wait either until extinguished by submergence below the sea, or regenerated by elevation into a new cycle of life"

Uplifted peneplains can be preserved as fossil landforms in conditions of extreme aridity or under non-eroding cold-based glacier ice. Erosion of peneplains by glaciers in shield regions is limited. In the Fennoscandian Shield average glacier erosion during the Quaternary amounts to tens of meters, albeit this was not evenly distributed. For glacier erosion to be effective in shields a long "preparation period" of weathering under non-glacial conditions may be a requirement.

Silicification of peneplain surfaces exposed to sub-tropical and tropical climate for long enough time can protect them from erosion.

== See also ==
- African Surface – Land surface formed by erosion covering large swathes of Africa
- Erosion surface – Natural surface created by rock erosion
- Summit accordance
