= Pediplain =

Extensive plain formed by the coalescence of pediments

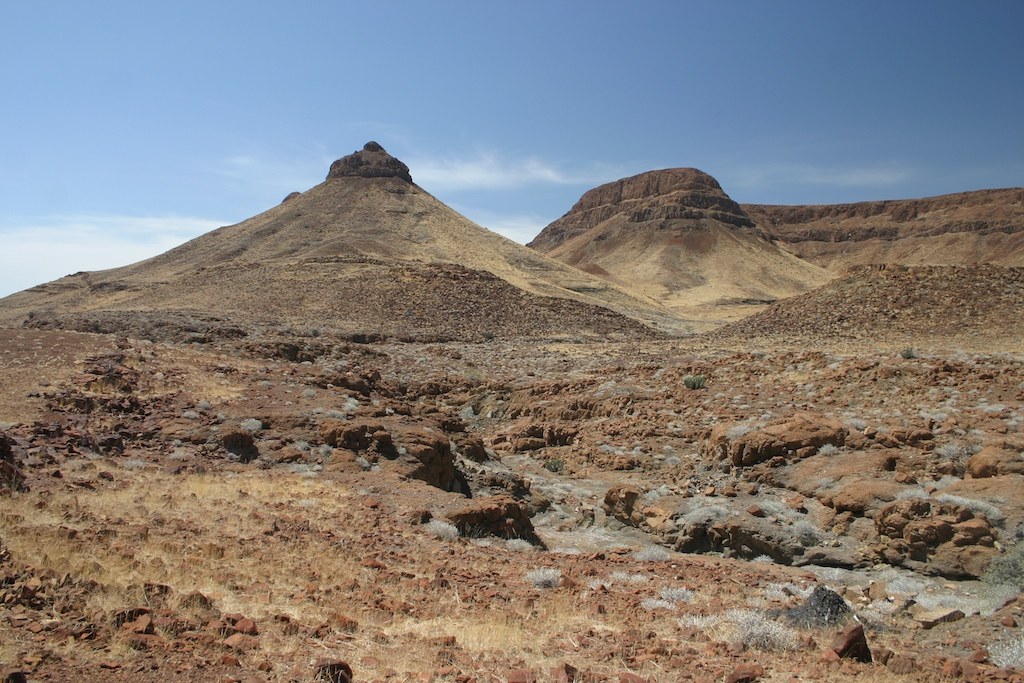
View of a scarpment and pediment in Namibia. The somewhat flat area in the foreground is an incipient pediplain.

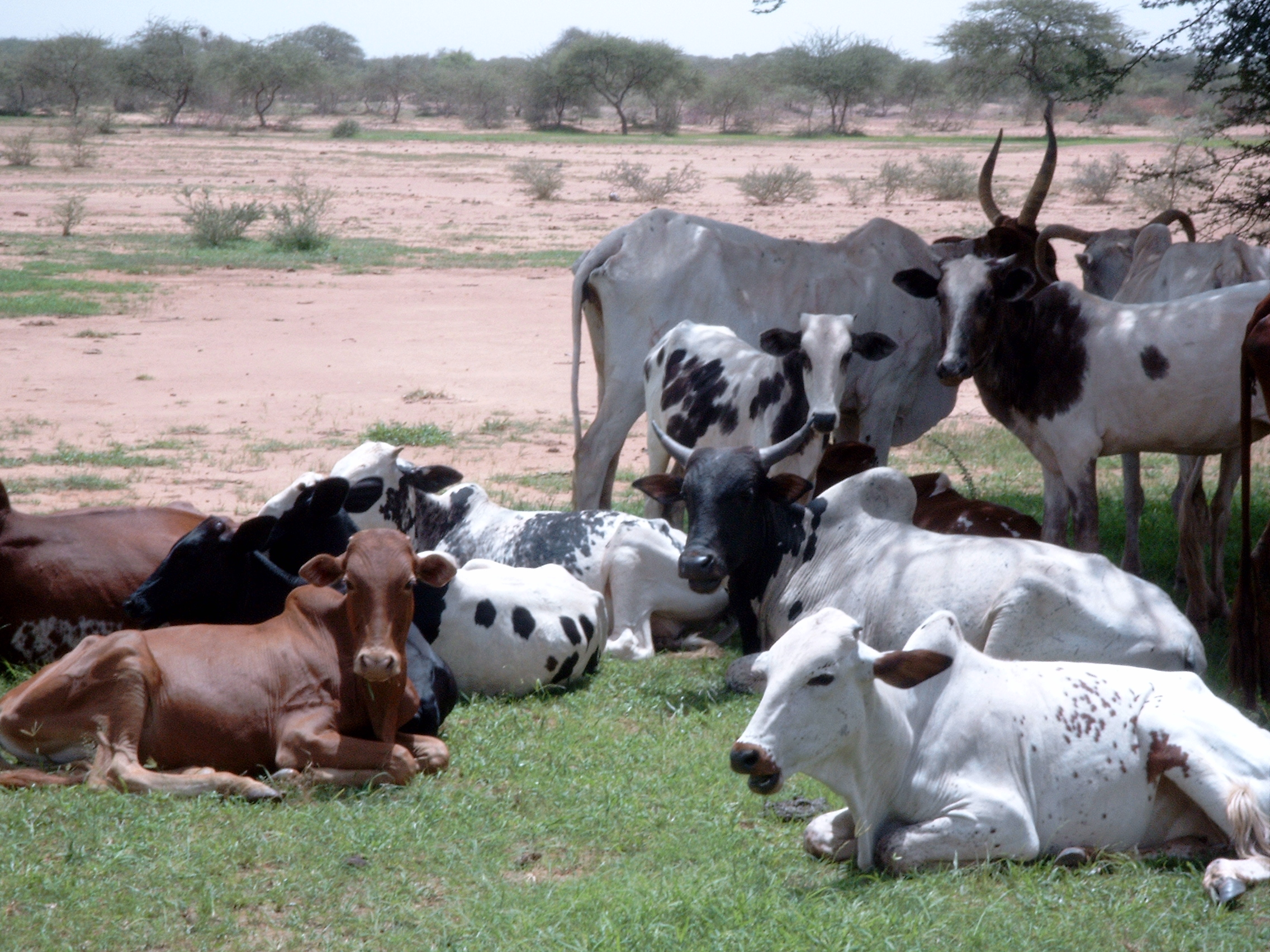
Cattle on an Oudalan pediplain, between Gorom and Oursi, Burkina Faso.

In geology and geomorphology a pediplain (from the Latin pes, genitive case pedis, meaning "foot") is an extensive plain formed by the coalescence of pediments. The processes through which pediplains forms is known as pediplanation. The concepts of pediplain and pediplanation were first developed by geologist Lester Charles King in his 1942 book South African Scenery. The concept gained notoriety as it was juxtaposed to peneplanation. (Note: King himself held that: : A peneplain in the Davisian sense, resulting from slope reduction and downwearing, does not exist in nature. It should be redefined as "an imaginary landform.")

The coalesced pediments of the pediplains may form a series of very gentle concave slopes. (Note: It is argued by T.J. Fair that peneplains also have these gentle concave forms, but W. M. Davis’ view on the issue is not clear, meaning possibly that he might have held that peneplains had very gentle convex slopes.) Pediplains main difference to W. M. Davis’ peneplains is in the history and processes behind, and less so in the final shape. Perhaps the most notable difference in form that may be present is that of residual hills which in Davis’ peneplains are to have gentle slopes while in pediplains they ought to have the same steepness as the slopes in the early stages of erosion leading to pediplanation.

Pediplanation is linked to scarp retreat in the following way: as scarps retreat over geological time pediments migrate and extend over large areas. The result is that the surface is eroded chiefly backward and that downward erosion is limited. In contrast to common peneplain conceptualizations several pediplains might form simultaneously at different altitudes and do not necessarily grade to a base level. Pediplains are normally formed in areas of arid and semi-arid climate. As climate changes arid and semi-arid periods of pediplanation may alternate with more humid periods of etchplanation resulting in the formation of flattish surfaces (peneplains) of mixed origin (polygenetic).

Cryoplanation is a variant of pediplanation that is restricted to cold climates.

== Examples ==
- Atacama Pediplain
- South Sudan

== See also ==
- Erosion surface – Natural surface created by rock erosion
- Etchplain – Plain where the bedrock has been subject to considerable subsurface weathering
- Paleosurface – Surface made by erosion of considerable antiquity
- Planation surface – Large-scale land surface that is almost flat
