= Paleosurface =

Surface made by erosion of considerable antiquity

In geology and geomorphology a paleosurface is a surface made by erosion of considerable antiquity. Paleosurfaces might be flat or uneven in some cases having considerable relief. Flat and large paleosurfaces —that is planation surfaces— have higher potential to be preserved than small and irregular surfaces and are thus the most studied kind of paleosurfaces. Irregular paleosurfaces, albeit usually smaller than flat ones, occur across the globe, one example being the Sudetes etchsurfaces. In the case of peneplains it is argued that they become paleosurfaces once they are detached from the base level they grade to.

Paleosurfaces form an important part of the geologic record in that they represent geological and geomorphological events.

Traditionally geologist and geomorphologist view paleosurfaces differently. Geologists look into the endogenic or constructive processes occurring to create that surface, such as crustal uplift and igneous activity. The stratigraphic record is valued by geologists allowing for a broader range of surface types to be considered. However, when paleosurfaces are viewed by geomorphologists the exogenic or deconstructive processes are considered. This is because geomorphologists are primarily concerned with erosional and weathering processes.

Geomorphologist Richard Huggett lists paleosurfaces as one of various categorizations of paleoplains.

== See also ==
- Cryoplanation surface – Formation of plains, terraces and pediments in periglacial environments
