= Walther Penck =

German geologist (1888–1923)

- Born: 30 August 1888; Vienna, Austria-Hungary
- Died: 29 September 1923 (aged 35); Stuttgart, Germany
- Citizenship: Germany
- Education: Heidelberg University
- Known for: Landscape evolution theorist
- Scientific career
- Fields: Geomorphology
- Workplaces: Dirección General de Minas; University of Constantinople; University of Leipzig

Walther Penck (30 August 1888 – 29 September 1923) was a geologist and geomorphologist known for his theories on landscape evolution. Penck is noted for criticizing key elements of the Davisian cycle of erosion, concluding that the process of uplift and denudation occur simultaneously, at gradual and continuous rates. Penck's idea of parallel slope retreat led to revisions of Davis's cycle of erosion.

== Biography ==
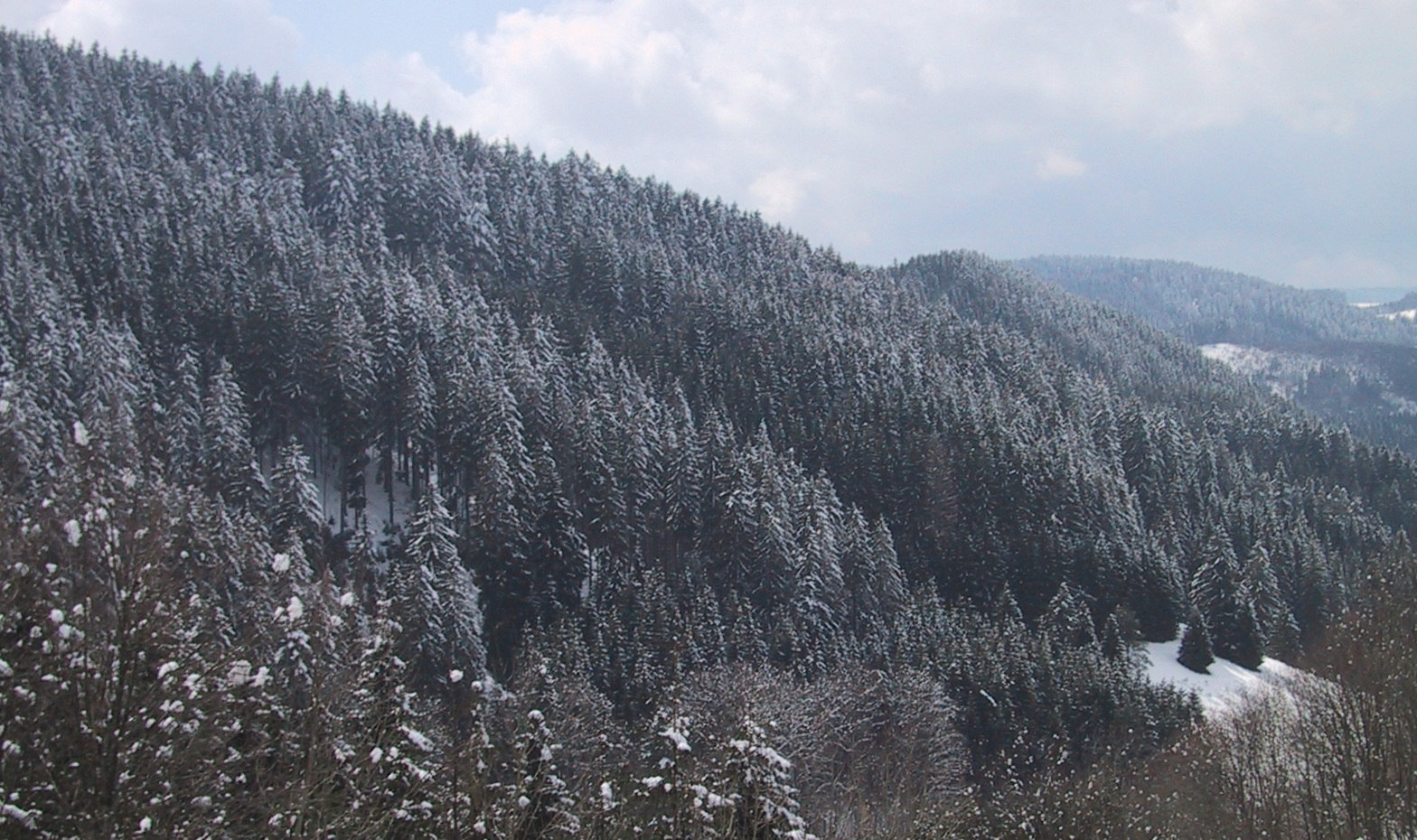
Mountains of the Black Forest where Walther Penck studied the effects of doming on geomorphology.

Walther Penck was born in Vienna as the son of German geographer Albrecht Penck. He obtained a PhD by studying petrology at the Heidelberg University. Between 1912 and 1915 he worked in Dirección General de Minas in Buenos Aires before moving to the University of Constantinople where he was named professor of mineralogy and geology. He finally settled as professor in the University of Leipzig in 1918. The areas he studied in detail and based his theories on include the Black Forest in Germany, Puna de Atacama in Argentina and Anatolia in modern Turkey.

During the 1920s Penck, with Siegfried Passarge, Alfred Hettner and his father, was the foremost figure in a broad German opposition to the "geographical cycle" theory of William Morris Davis. It was characteristic of Davis to react violently and disdainfully to criticism, particularly to this German criticism; it was also his characteristic to choose to attack the most vulnerable points of that criticism. Regarding Walther Penck's objections to the Davisian geographic cycle Davis commented to Albrecht Penck in 1921:

It is pleasant news that your son, Walther, is established as professor in Leipzig where his father long ago studied. As he may have told you, I have enjoyed reading parts of his Argentine monograph, an able piece of work, and I have written asking him to specify the difficulties he finds in accepting the cycle theory. I am inclined to believe that he really does not know what that theory is...

Walther Penck died of oral cancer in September 1923. His book, Morphological Analysis of Landforms, was published posthumously in 1924 by his father, as was his paper Die Piedmontflächen des südlichen Schwarzwald (The piedmont-flats of the southern Black Forest).

== Geomorphological theory ==
=== Concepts ===
In his analysis Penck utilized the following concepts:

1. Endrumpf: A low-angle landscape with concave slopes. It is the final stage of erosion that follows after inselbergs and pediments are eroded.
2. Grossfalt: A series of folds and synclines analogous to orogenic folding. It is usual type of folds created by lateral compression in the crust. As the grossfalt develops it narrows at the same time they become higher. Can be translated as 'great fold' in English. Davis translated it into 'broad fold'. Penck himself was unhappy with the term grossfalt.
3. Piedmontfläche: Can be translated into English as 'piedmont flat', 'piedmont bench' or 'piedmont step'.
4. Piedmonttreppen: descending erosional benches on an uplifted area. Their shape is more or less concentric. Penck interpreted the Piedmonttreppen as the result of doming. Benches he thought originated as Piedmontflache in the periphery of the dome before they were uplifted. It can be translated into English as 'piedmont benchland', 'piedmont stairway' or 'piedmont treppe'.
5. Primärrumpf: A more or less plain and subtly convex slope. The form is given by the very slow waxing of erosion. Erosion cycles should begin from a primärrumpf. Can be formed at the base of a dome.
6. Rumpfläche

=== Landform and landscape evolution according to uplift rate ===
Walther Penck thought landform development depended on uplift rate. He saw three main types of landform and landscape development all of which begun with rumpfläches or primärrumpfs and ended with endrumpfs. The differences between them depended on their rate of uplift: peneplains developed in places with a low rate of uplift, intermediate forms developed in places of moderate uplift, and Alpine forms developed on places of rapid uplift. In Penck's valley development model the steepness of valley slopes depended on the rate of uplift; this view contrasts with the Davis's erosion cycle, in which valley slope steepness depends on its relative age or stage of development.

=== Landform associations ===
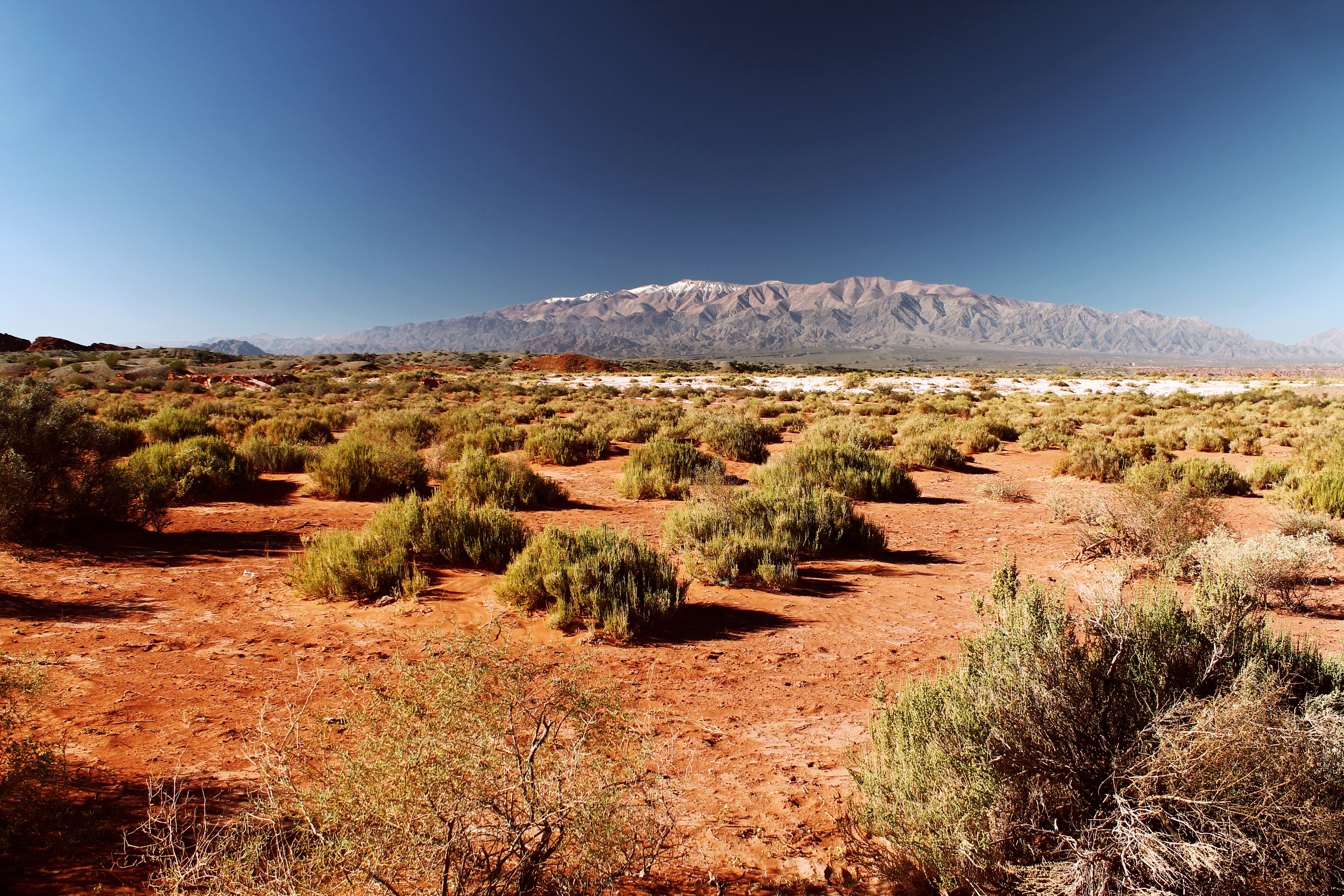
Sierra de Famatina in Argentina interpreted as part of a grossfalt by Penck.

Penck thought earths surface could be divided into three types of regions each with an own landform association. First there were regions of grossfalt and general doming, then there were regions of pure doming, and at last there were regions of stability.

== Criticism and legacy ==
William Morris Davis, a friend of Penck's father, criticized the theories Walther Penck outlined in Die Piedmontflichen des südlichen Schwarzwald. Geographer Martin Simons claimed in 1962 that Davis misunderstood and mis-translated parts of the paper leaving a distorted view of Penck's ideas among later workers. Simons therefore does not consider Davis an adequate critic of Penck's work. Other factors detrimental to an understanding of Penck's ideas include his early death and his confusing writing style. Albrecht Penck is not known to have publicly taken any stance for or against his son's theory. Douglas Wilson Johnson, a coastal geomorphologist and staunch supporter of Davis, criticized Penck's theory harshly as:

"Penck’s conception that slope profiles are convex, plane, or concave according to the circumstances of the uplifting action, [as] one of the most fantastic errors ever introduced into geomorphology"

Penck's theories had a much more limited influence in Germany compared to the English-speaking world where they gained notoriety for their contrasts to Davis'. As of 1983 it was noted that albeit Penck's theories were ignored in the discussion of the geomorphology of Central European massifs, the theories were often discussed in English-language Geomorphological textbooks.

Julius Büdel, a German geomorphologist working in the same areas as Penck in Southern Germany, provided alternative explanations in 1935 for some of the landforms Penck had dealt with.

Geographer Allaoua Saadi remarks by 2013 that Penck's and Davis' ideas have become more compatible and even complementary since the advent of modern tectonic theory. This author claims that Davis' ideas are more applicable near active margins where tectonics are "cataclysmic" and Penck's ideas fit better in passive margins and continental platforms.

Walther Penck has a volcano named after him in northwestern Argentina.
