= Planation surface =

Large-scale land surface that is almost flat

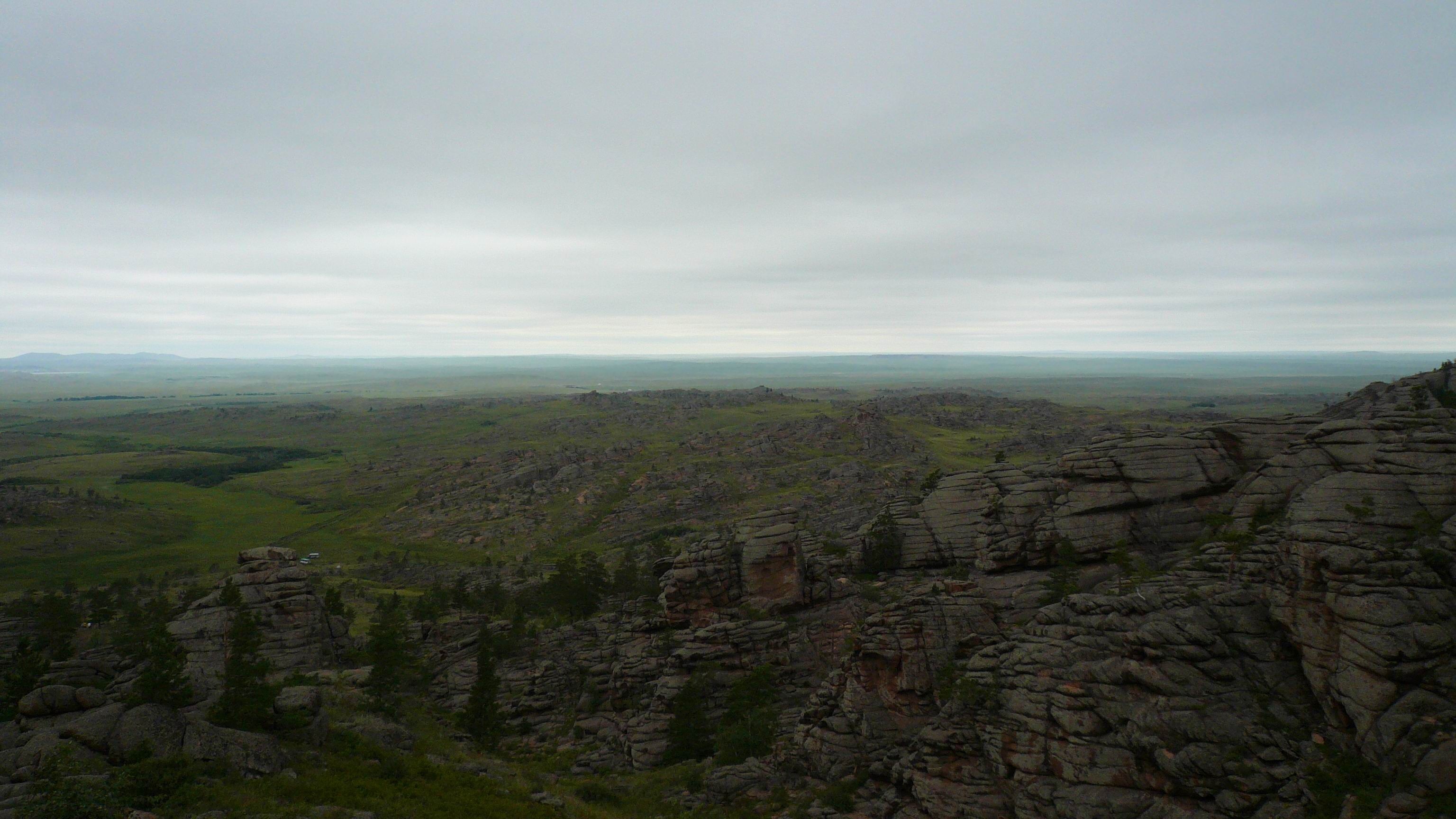
View of the Kazakh Uplands which is a tectonically uplifted planation surface. The background areas are particularly flat. The Kazakh Uplands are usually referred as a peneplain.

In geology and geomorphology a planation surface is a large-scale land surface that is almost flat with the possible exception of some residual hills. The processes that form planation surfaces are labelled collectively planation and are exogenic (chiefly erosion). Planation surfaces are planated regardless of bedrock structures. On Earth, they constitute some of the most common landscapes. Geological maps indicate that planation surfaces may comprise 65% of the landscapes on Saturn's largest moon, Titan, which hosts a hydrological cycle of liquid methane. Peneplains and pediplains are types of planation surfaces planated respectively by "peneplanation" and "pediplanation". In addition to these there are planation surfaces proposed to be formed by cryoplanation, marine processes, areal glacial erosion and salt weathering. The term planation surface is often preferred over others because some more specific planation surface types and processes remain controversial. Etchplains are weathered planation surfaces.

Large planation surfaces, like the African Surface, are typically formed diachronously.

Planation surfaces are often thought to form at distinct base levels with sequences of them representing uplift events. However the disposition of some so-called planation surfaces may at certain places reflect better the easiness of erosion into different lithologies or structures and may therefore not fit any uplift scheme.

== See also ==
- Erosion surface – Natural surface created by rock erosion
- Summit accordance
