= River incision =

Natural lowering of a stream bed deep near bedrock over time

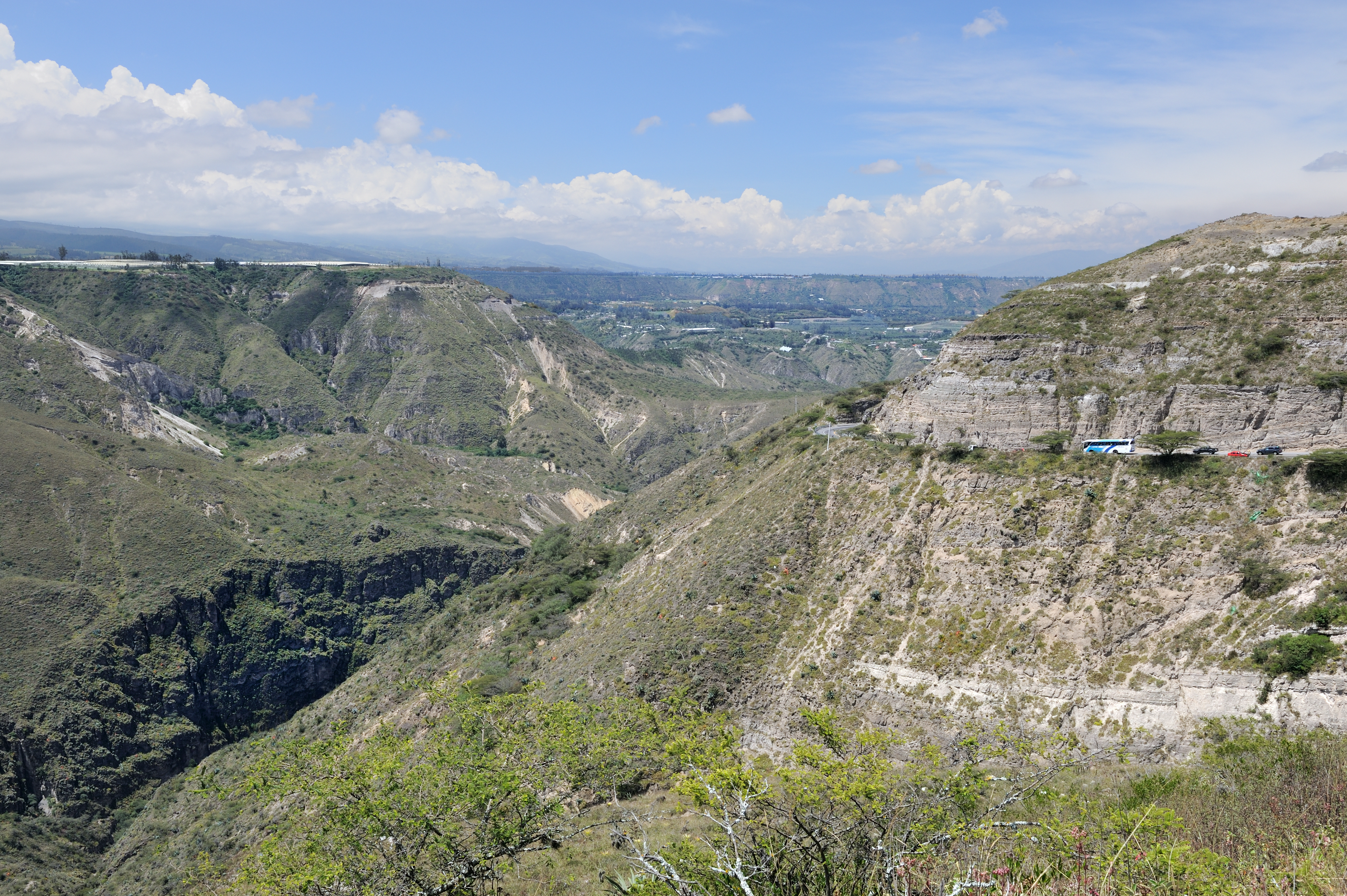
Incised stream in the Ecuadorian Andes in Cayambe Canton.

River incision is the narrow erosion caused by a river or stream that is far from its base level. River incision is common after tectonic uplift of the landscape. Incision by multiple rivers result in a dissected landscape, for example a dissected plateau. River incision is the natural process by which a river cuts downward into its bed, deepening the active channel. Though it is a natural process, it can be accelerated rapidly by human factors including land use changes such as timber harvest, mining, agriculture, and road and dam construction. The rate of incision is a function of basal shear-stress. Shear stress is increased by factors such as sediment in the water, which increase its density. Shear stress $t$ is proportional to water mass, gravity, and WSS:

$$t = \rho gD\sin{(WSS)}$$

where t is shear stress (N/m2), ρ is density of flowing water, g is gravity on Earth, D is average water depth, and WSS is Water Surface Slope. This is analogous to the basal shear stress commonly used in glaciology. Increases in slope, depth, or density of water increase the water's potential to cause erosion.

== Causes ==
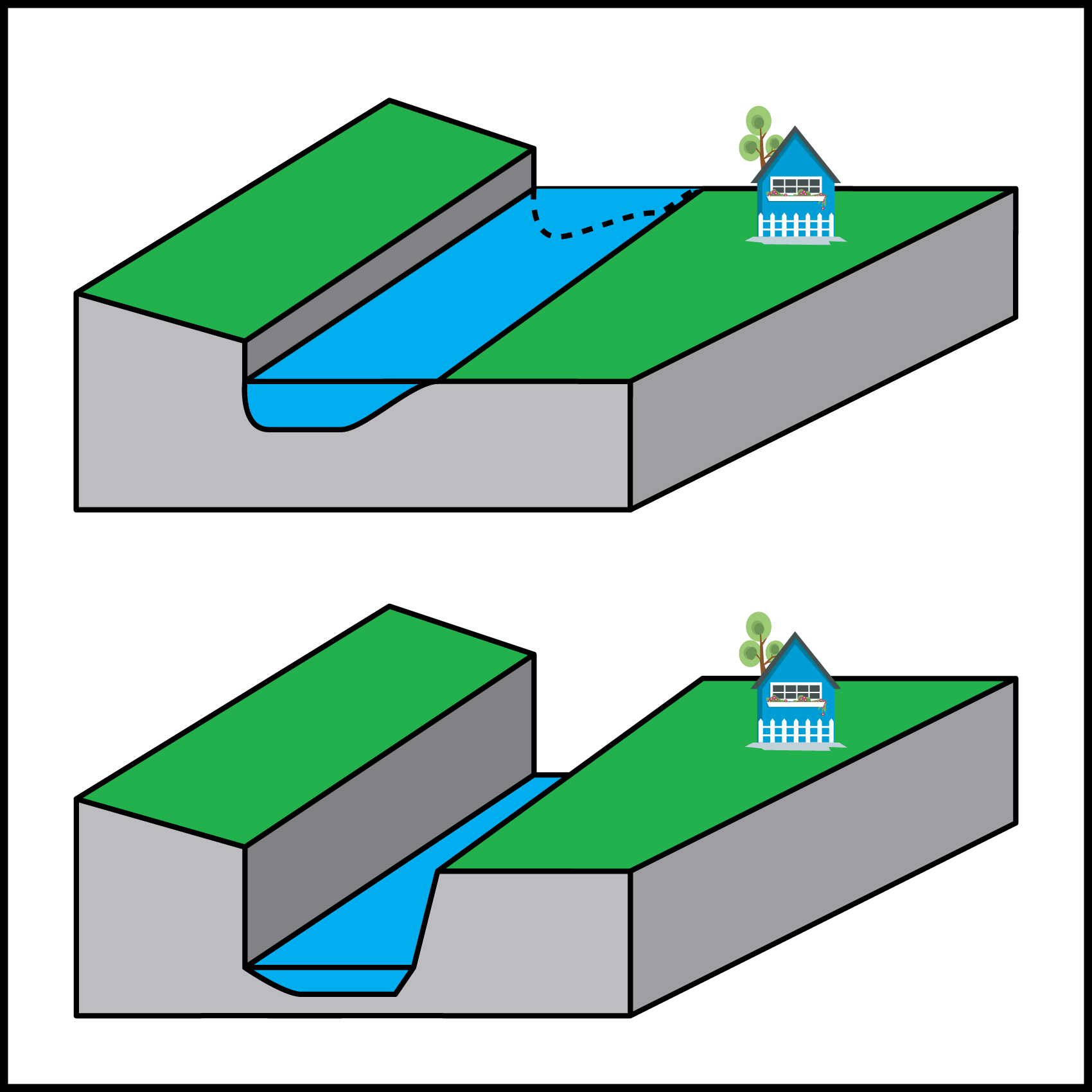
Schematic of a river incising downward through bedrock (gray). Process begins with the top image.

Traditional logging in the West coast of the United States included many practices which increased river incision. Timber removal and the associated road construction facilitate runoff and thus increased erosion and sediment delivery to streams. Increases in sediment increases the water's stream power, increasing the stream's ability to do geomorphic work on the bed and banks. This leads to scouring of the bed material, exposing the bedrock channel bed to erosion and thus faster rates of channel incision. The scoured bed material consists of finer sediments such as silts, sands, and gravels. The removal of these removes important aquatic habitats for salmonid species and other aquatic organisms. In many agricultural areas, rivers have been straightened and dyked for flood control and to plant crops in the floodplain. Normally, floods are allowed to spread out across the floodplain, allowing deposition of sediment and slowing water speeds, reducing the erosive potential of the water. Channelization concentrates flood flows down the active channel, increasing erosion. River incision due to agriculture is well-documented throughout the agricultural regions of the world, such as the Central Valley of California.

In-stream gravel mining is also well documented as a cause of river incision. Stable material on the river bed mitigate erosion, removing this armoring layer of gravel, boulders, etc. exposes the channel bed to the erosive force of the water. "On the Russian River near Healdsburg, California, instream pit mining in the 1950s and 1960s caused channel incision in excess of 3-6 m over an 11-km length of river."

Tectonics play an important role in shaping landscapes and rivers, and tectonic uplift and river incision go hand in hand. Over geologic time, as mountains rise higher, water erodes deep gorges and channels, dissecting the landscape. In some instances, such as the Sierra Nevada mountains of California, up to 1 km of incision has been shown to have occurred over the last 5 million years. "River erosion is one of the primary agents of landscape evolution. Outside of glaciated regions, rivers are responsible for sculpting uplifted terrain into arborescent valley networks and creating the relief that drives gravitational transport processes such as landsliding". Rivers and streams that cross tectonic boundaries are subject to immense geomorphic change. When an area in the path of a river is uplifted, the river must either divert, or slowly incise into the uplifted area, creating a gorge or canyon.

== Effects ==
=== Groundwater level drop ===
As a channel bed drops, the water in the surrounding aquifer runs into the stream, lowering the water table. This modifies the flow regime of a stream, and can lead to a large reduction in summer flows. Prolonged incision can lower the water table to the point where the roots of the riparian vegetation can no longer access it for water, causing the death of the riparian forest and thus a loss of soil stability, contributing to increased sedimentation. Riparian forests are some of the most productive and diverse ecosystems on the planet and are for this reason the focus of many restoration projects throughout the United States.

=== Change in hillslope form ===
At low erosion rates increased stream incision may make gentle slopes to erode creating convex-up forms. Convex slopes around a stream can thus indirectly reflect accelerated crustal uplift. This is because accelerated incision may trigger accelerated erosion on the adjacent slopes creating slopes progressively steeper slopes that are in equilibrium with high erosion rates. (Note: Walther Penck is commonly but wrongly attributed the notion that accelerated uplift leads to the formation of convex slopes.)
