= Cryoplanation =

Formation of plains, terraces and pediments in periglacial environments

In geomorphology, cryoplanation or is a term used to both describe and explain the formation of plains, terraces and pediments in periglacial environments. Uncertainty surrounds the term, and the effectiveness of the cryoplanation process is held to be limited meaning it can only produce small terraces. Instead, many of so-called cryoplanation terraces are likely an expression of the underlying lithology and rock structure rather than being unique products of cold-climate processes.

Cryoplanation can be seen as a variant of pediplanation that is restricted to cold climates. All the cryoplanation surfaces that exist at present date to the Quaternary.

== History of the concept ==
The existence of flat bedrock surfaces in the mountains of Siberia was noted in the 1930s. Soviet scientists S.G. Boch and I.I. Krasnov first proposed a cyclical model for the formation these surfaces in 1943. This model influenced central and western European geomorphologists. Carl Troll, writing in German, called these surfaces “solifluktions-rumpf”, and Jean Tricart, writing in French called them “penéplaine périglaciaire”. In 1946 Kirk Bryan coined the English term “cryoplanation”. From the late 1970s onwards these surfaces are seldom mentioned in Russian scientific literature.

Terraces formed by cryoplanation are called cryoplanation terraces. Czudek described cryoplanation terraces as gently inclined or nearly horizontal bedrock-cut benches on slopes, spurs and on broad interfluves that are formed by the parallel retreat of steeper slope segments under periglacial conditions. Additionally, with the effect of cryoplanation on the landscape, the vegetation on these frost-altered terraces is also reshaped. The vegetation tends to be uniquely uniform both laterally and vertically. The results of this unique freeze-thaw cycle are customarily found in Arctic periglacial regions of Eastern Siberia and Alaska. They may also be found in areas that currently or have sometime in the past experienced intense seasonal freezing or permafrost.

In 1950 Peltier proposed the existence of a "periglacial cycle of erosion". This would begin with a non-periglaciated landscape. Once-periglaciated mass wasting of regolith exposes bedrock in the upper slopes. These outcrops are then subject to frost weathering that makes slopes retreat forming extensive blockfields at the base of the bedrock areas. At a later stage solifluction wears down summits and fills in topographic lows.

== Assessment ==
The concept has been questioned. According to geomorphologists Kevin Hall and Marie-Françoise André the theory has caused confusion because of “the almost complete absence of actual data from active cryoplanation terraces”. It is considered unlikely that cryoplanation can produce any large surfaces. Cryoplanation can be defined as a variant of pediplanation that is restricted to cold climates. Some terraces developed on flood basalt in eastern Lesotho Highlands, Southern Africa, have been suggested to fit most of the criteria to be cryoplanation terraces except they are more the result of rock structure than of planation.

== See also ==
- Climatic geomorphology
- Glacial buzzsaw
