= Borsu surface =

The Borsu surface (Swedish: Borsuytan) is an erosion surface found as valley benches in the northern Scandinavian Mountains. The surface was first identified by Walter Wråk who published his findings in Ymer in 1908.
