= Epigenetic valley =

Valley created by erosion and with little or no sympathy for bedrock structure

In geology and geomorphology, a valley created by erosion and with little or no sympathy for bedrock structure is labelled an epigenetic valley. Epigenetic valleys are inherited landforms. Arthur Holmes lists the radial valleys of the Lake District in England as examples of epigenetic valleys.

== Sources ==
- Holmes, Arthur (1952). Geología Física (in Spanish). Translated by Rafael Candel Vila; Joaquina Comas de Candel. Barcelona: Ediciones Omega S. A. pp. 181–182.
