= Charles Cotton (geologist) =

New Zealand geologist and geomorphologist (1885–1970)

Sir Charles Cotton KBE
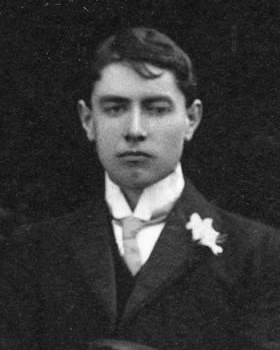
- Cotton in 1912
- Born: 24 February 1885; Dunedin, New Zealand
- Died: 29 June 1970 (aged 85); Lower Hutt, New Zealand
- Education: University of Otago
- Awards: Victoria Medal (1951)
- Scientific career
- Fields: Geomorphology; Geology
- Workplaces: Victoria University College

Sir Charles Andrew Cotton KBE (24 February 1885 – 29 June 1970) was a New Zealand geologist and geomorphologist, described as one of the leading scientists that New Zealand has produced.

== Early life and family ==
Born in Dunedin, Cotton was educated at Christchurch Boys' High School, where he lost the sight in his left eye because of a schoolmate's prank. In 1908 Cotton graduated from the University of Otago with an MSc, with first-class honours in geology.

== Academic career ==
Cotton was then director of the Coromandel School of Mines from 1908 to 1909, and geology lecturer at Victoria University College from 1909 to 1920, when he was appointed to the newly created chair of geology. He retired in 1953, and that year was awarded the Queen Elizabeth II Coronation Medal. In the 1959 Queen's Birthday Honours, Cotton was appointed a Knight Commander of the Order of the British Empire. According to Cotton himself an important development to his scientific career was the introduction of air mail to New Zealand allowing letters to arrive or be received from Europe within two weeks.

Cotton was a leading New Zealand scientist, and became an international authority on geomorphology through the publication of his books and papers, the most notable of which include Geomorphology of New Zealand (1922), Landscape (1941), Geomorphology (1942), Climatic Accidents in Landscape Making (1942), Volcanoes as Landscape Forms (1944), The Earth Beneath (1945), Living on a Planet (1945), and New Zealand Geomorphology (1955).

Cotton's work became the inspiration for much of Colin McCahon's landscape painting.

== Legacy ==
Cotton is considered to be one of the leading scientists New Zealand has yet produced. Victoria University of Wellington has named a building to honour Cotton. The building on the Kelburn campus contains a low-rise block with science departments, a group of lecture theatres and laboratories and "Cotton Street", an enclosed concourse with shops and displays.
