= Denudation chronology =

Denudation chronology is the study of the long-term evolution of topography seen as sequence. Denudation chronology revolves around episodes of landscape-wide erosion, better known as denudation. The cycle of erosion model is a common approach used to establish denudation chronologies.
