= African Surface =

Land surface formed by erosion covering large swathes of Africa

The African Surface or African Erosion Surface is a land surface formed by erosion covering large swathes of Africa. The type area of the surface lies in South Africa where the surface was first identified as such by Lester Charles King in the mid-20th century.

The term was coined by King for certain high surfaces in southern Africa. Over the years he redefined it various times leaving some confusion not on its reality but on the matter of its precise meaning and extent. In 2008 the term was redefined as a composite surface. According to the 2008 study the African Surface is made up by etchplains formed between 70 and 40 million years ago. In this sense the existence of parts of the African Surface at different elevations is the result of continental-scale warping due to endogenic forces.

In Central Africa the African Surface can be found in uplifted position in several domes and elongated bulges between these domes and also in downwarped basins. The domes include the East African, Ethiopian, Cameroon, Angola, the Central African Atlantic Swell and the Central African Rise. Subdued regions include the Congo Basin where the African Surface lies about 300 metres (980 ft) above sea level and the Turkana Gap. In the interior of Western Africa the so-called Bauxitic Surface has been identified as equivalent to the African Surface.

== See also ==
- African superswell – Geological region of exceptional tectonic uplift
- Great Escarpment, Southern Africa – Major topographical feature in Africa
