= Eiju Yatsu =

Japanese geologist (1920–2016)

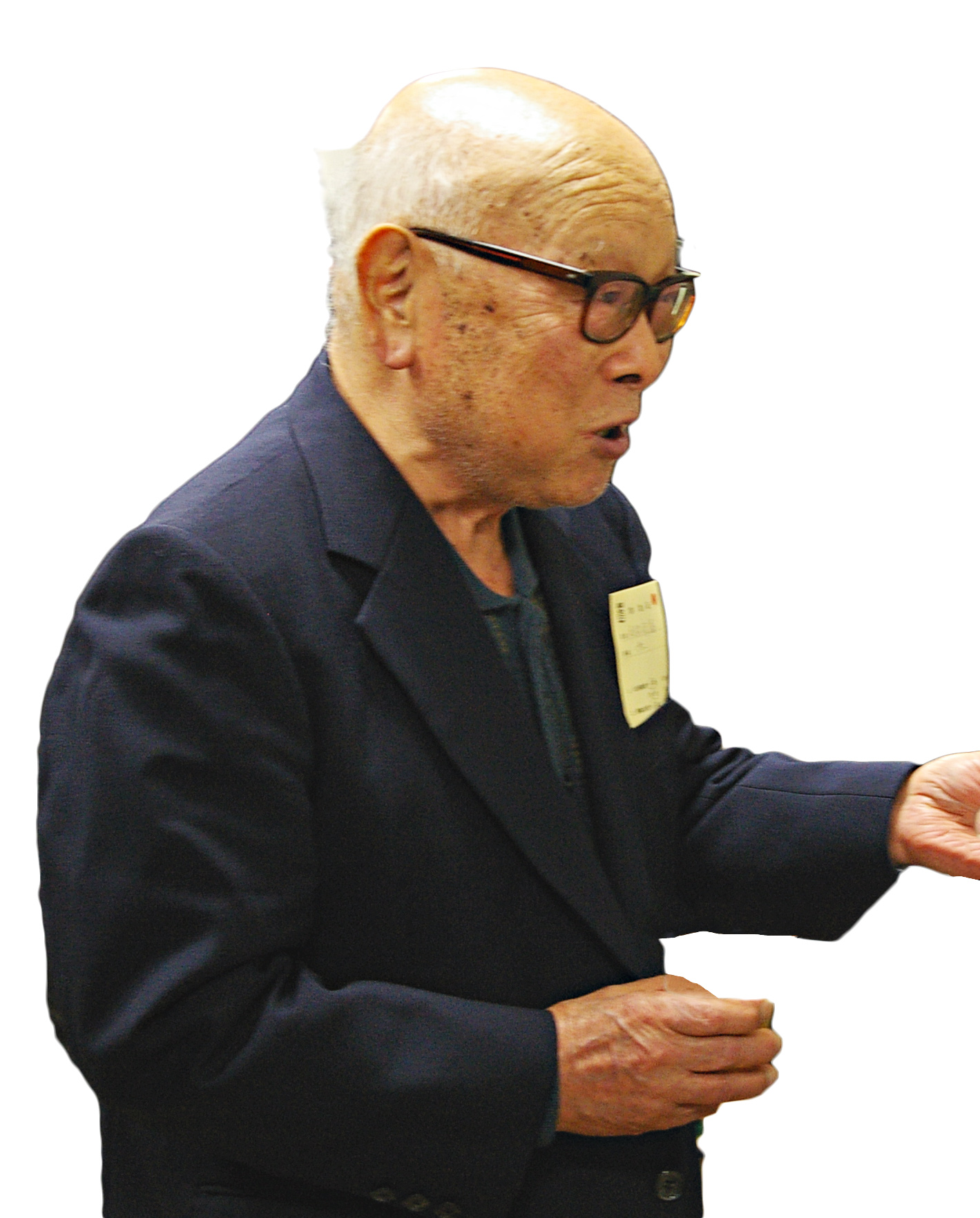
- Eiju Yatsu in 2007
- Born: July 20, 1920; Mito, Ibaraki
- Died: December 15, 2016 (aged 96); Matsudo, Chiba
- Citizenship: Japan
- Known for: his books
- Scientific career
- Fields: Geomorphology

Eiju Yatsu (20 July 1920 - 15 December 2016) was a Japanese geomorphologist who taught in Japan, US and Canada. He is best known for his contributions to weathering and 'rock control' in geomorphology.

== Career ==
Eiju Yatsu was born in Mito City, Ibaraki Prefecture, Japan in 1920. In 1940, he entered the Tokyo Higher Normal School and studied literature and geography but then changed his interests to science. He graduated from the Tokyo University of Literature and Science in 1945 with a BSc, having studied physical geography, geology and geophysics. He then went on to do a wide range of postgraduate studies and was awarded a DSc from Tokyo University of Education[?] in 1957. From 1954 to 1966, he was assistant and then full professor at Chuo University (Tokyo), teaching earth sciences and engineering geology. He was visiting professor at Louisiana State University in 1965–66 and the University of Ottawa in 1966–69, and then became associate and then full professor at the University of Guelph. In 1976, he left Canada to return to Japan and became professor at the Institute of Geosciences, University of Tsukuba, where he taught geomorphology and rock mechanics. From 1980 to 1986, he was professor at Joetsu University of Education teaching environmental science.

== Scientific contributions ==
Professor Yatsu is best known for several influential research texts in geomorphology. In particular, 'Rock Control in Geomorphology ', written when Yatsu was in the Department of Geography at the University of Ottawa, although the book stemmed from lectures given at Louisiana State University. Yatsu indicates (Chapter 5, p. 125) the ethos and a definition of ‘rock control’:

Geomorphology should be constructed on a scientific basis, especially exact dating, correct of processes, and physico-chemical and mechanical understanding of rocks. The intention of this essay has not been to explain how rock controls are reflected in land forms, but to emphasize the importance of physicochemical and mechanical understanding of rocks in geomorphological studies and also to explain, to some degree, such thinking and methods of studying.

This emphasis on a scientific view of geomorphology was continued by his comprehensive (although cited as an Introduction) The Nature of Weathering which covered basic rock mechanics and weathering organisms, both rarely included in more recent texts on weathering. The ideas of rock control in geomorphology are still relevant in explaining landforms.

Yatsu's interest in the science of geomorphology also extended to philosophical aspects of the subject in a 'Great debate' about the subject. This paper and one of 1992 comprise Part 1 of Fantasia in Geomorphology. Part 2 of this volume is a wide-ranging discussion of the philosophy and practice of geomorphology that includes Peirce's theory of abductive reasoning, Paul Feyerabend's 'anything goes' by way of 'Neurath's boat'.

Discussion of these views of the philosophy, or pragmatism, involved in geomorphology still continues.

== Selected bibliography ==
- 1966 Rock Control in geomorphology, Tokyo: Sozosha
- 1971 Landform material science, rock control in geomorphology. Proceedings, 1st Guelph Symposium on Geomorphology, 49-73.
- 1992 To make geomorphology more scientific. Transactions, Japanese Geomorphological Union, 13, 2, 87-124.
- 1996 Graffiti on the wall of a geomorphology laboratory. Geomorphology Sans Frontieres, Eds. McCann, S.B. and Ford, D.C. Chichester: John Wiley, 53-58.
- 2002 Fantasia in Geomorphology Reprint of "To Make Geomorplogy More Scientific" and its Supplemental Discussion. Tokyo: Sozosha.
