= Nathaniel Shaler =

American paleontologist and geologist (1841–1906)

Nathaniel Southgate Shaler
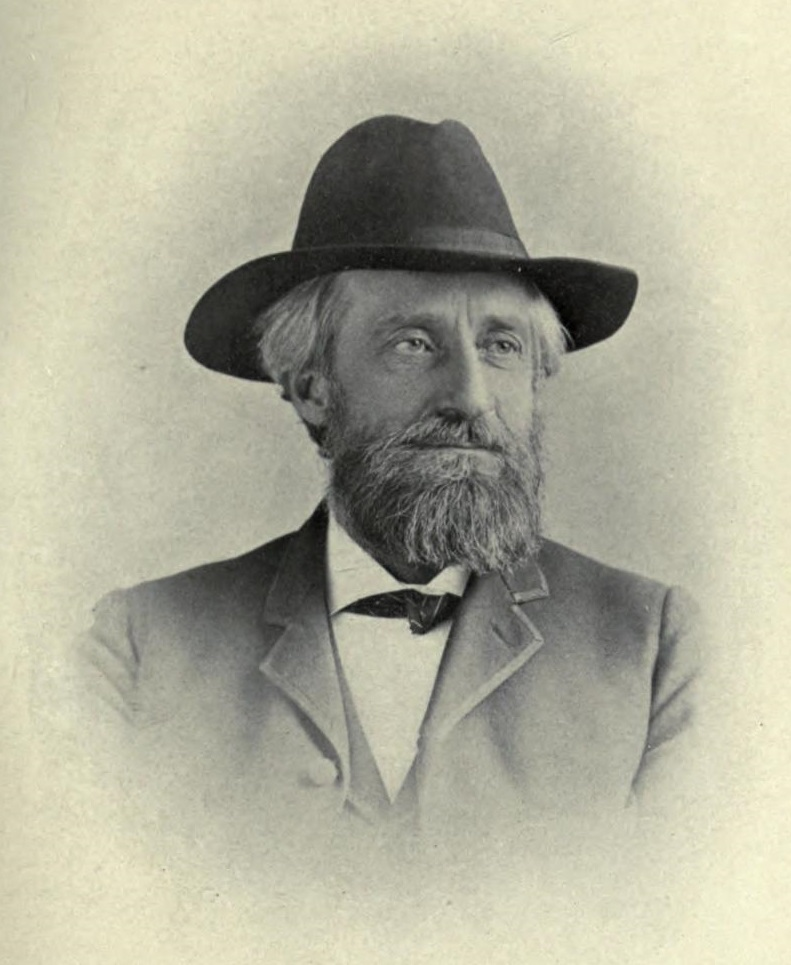
- Shaler in 1894
- Born: February 20, 1841; Newport, Kentucky
- Died: April 10, 1906 (aged 65); Cambridge, Massachusetts
- Education: Harvard College
- Scientific career
- Fields: Paleontology, Geology
- Workplaces: Lawrence Scientific School
- Doctoral advisor: Louis Agassiz
- Doctoral students: Charles Henry Smyth Jr. Edward A. Birge
- Other notable students: Ralph Stockman Tarr
- Author abbrev. (zoology): Shaler

Signature
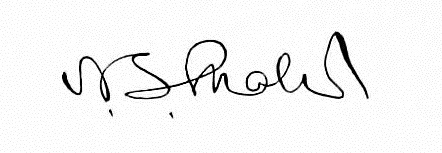

Nathaniel Southgate Shaler (February 20, 1841 – April 10, 1906) was an American paleontologist and geologist who wrote extensively on the theological and scientific implications of the theory of evolution, whose work is now considered scientific racism.

== Biography ==
Born to a slave-holding family in Kentucky in 1841, Shaler studied at Harvard College's Lawrence Scientific School under Louis Agassiz. After graduating in 1862, Shaler went on to become a Harvard fixture in his own right, as lecturer (1868), professor of paleontology for two decades (1869–1888) and as professor of geology for nearly two more (1888–1906). Beginning in 1891, he was dean of the Lawrence School. Shaler was appointed director of the Kentucky Geological Survey in 1873, and devoted a part of each year until 1880 to that work. In 1884, he was appointed geologist to the U.S. Geological Survey in charge of the Atlantic division. He was commissioner of agriculture for Massachusetts at different times, and was president of the Geological Society of America in 1895. He also served two years as a Union officer in the American Civil War.

== Research: ecology, geology, and scientific racism ==
Early in his professional career, Shaler was broadly a creationist and anti-Darwinist. This was largely out of deference to the brilliant but old-fashioned Agassiz, whose patronage served Shaler well in ascending the Harvard ladder. When his own position at Harvard was secure, Shaler gradually accepted Darwinism in principle but viewed it through a neo-Lamarckian lens. Shaler extended Charles Darwin's work on the importance of earthworm soil bioturbation to soil formation to other animals, such as ants. Like many other evolutionists of the time, Shaler incorporated basic tenets of natural selection—chance, contingency, opportunism—into a picture of order, purpose and progress in which characteristics were inherited through the efforts of individual organisms.

Shaler was an apologist for slavery and an outspoken believer in the superiority of the Anglo-Saxon race. In his later career, Shaler continued to support Agassiz's polygenism, a theory of human origins that was often used to support racial discrimination, falling under the category of Scientific racism. In his 1884 article, "The Negro Problem", published in the Atlantic Monthly, Shaler claimed that black people freed from slavery were "like children lost in the wood, needing the old protection of the strong mastering hand," that they became increasingly dominated by their "animal nature" as they grew from children into adults, and American slavery had been "infinitely the mildest and most decent system of slavery that ever existed."

Shaler published work describing the physical geography of different continents and linking these geologic settings to the intelligence and strength of human races that inhabited these spaces. In Nature and Man in America, Shaler justifies the superiority of the Aryan race based on their development within European topography, "marvelously suited to be the cradles of people", erroneously attributing their origin to the Scandinavian provinces, "a field which seems to have been the seat of the strongest men in the world for thousands of years." Expanding upon this logic, Shaler explains that a Scandinavian origin is most fitting because it would seem strange that the "most vigorous and at the same time the most plastic of the world-peoples should have developed among the limited opportunities afforded by high Asia." Similarly, Shaler disparages the topography of the Americas, Africa, and Australia, claiming that these continents "have shown by their human products that they are unfitted to be the cradle places of great peoples." Nevertheless, Shaler is particularly interested in North America. Although he explains that its "large, simple, and easily comprehensible geographic features" as well as unfavorable climate for agriculture render the continent "unfit to cradle great peoples", he argues that the topography is perfectly suited for a race with better characteristics. Thus, Shaler argues that North America has "peculiar advantages” for American people (of Aryan descent) because the climate and topography of the land is ideal for the institution of slavery, which made it possible to cultivate this "new and rude land".

Shaler believed that slavery was greatly beneficial for the United States, and even went so far as to suggest that slaves themselves benefitted from this institution, suggesting slavery "led to the rapid accumulation of wealth, and in this way brought the people the sooner into a condition in which they could control their own destiny." Expressing concern that the South will "release into barbarism", Shaler proposes that "the advance of the negro to a satisfactory grade of development still depends upon his remaining in close contact with the superior race."

== Legacy at Harvard University ==
In his later career, Shaler served as Harvard's Dean of Sciences and was considered one of the university's most popular teachers. He published scores of long and short treatises in his lifetime, with subjects ranging from topographical surveys to moral philosophy. Shaler mentored many students, including William Morris Davis, who worked for him as a field assistant, and was later hired by Shaler to teach at Harvard. Davis became a renowned geographer, and similar to Shaler, wrote about how different geographies produced more or less fit societies. When Shaler passed, a fund was set up by alumni in his honor, which was specified to be used for field experiences, and these funds are still in use for student field trips today.

Shaler was a neighbor of businessman Gordon McKay, and convinced McKay to leave most of his enormous fortune to fund expansion of Harvard's science programs.

== Works ==
- (1870). On the Phosphate Beds of South Carolina.
- (1876–82). Geological Survey of Kentucky [6 vols.]
- (1876). Memoirs of the Geological Survey of Kentucky.
- (1878). Thoughts on the Nature of Intellectual Property and its Importance to the State.
- (1880). "The Geology of Boston and its Environs," in The Memorial History of Boston.
- (1881). Illustrations of the Earth's Surface; Glaciers [with William Morris Davis].
- (1884) "The Negro Problem", article in the Atlantic Monthly
- (1884). A First Book in Geology.
- (1885). Kentucky, a Pioneer Commonwealth ["American Commonwealth Series"].
- (1891). Nature and Man in America.
- (1891). Origin and Nature of Soils.
- (1892). The Story of Our Continent.
- (1893). The Interpretation of Nature.
- (1894). The United States of America (Volume 1) (Volume 2)
- (1895). Domesticated Animals.
- (1895). The Geology of the Road-Building Stones of Massachusetts.
- (1896). American Highways.
- (1898). Geology of the Cape Cod District.
- (1898). Outlines of the Earth's History.
- (1899). Geology of the Narragansett Basin.
- (1900). The Individual: Study of Life and Death.
- (1903). A Comparison of the Features of the Earth and the Moon.
- (1904). The Citizen: A Study of the Individual and the Government.
- (1904). The Neighbor.
- (1905). Man and the Earth.
- (1909). The Autobiography of Nathaniel Southgate Shaler.

Fiction

- (1903). Elizabeth of England: A Dramatic Romance in Five Parts.

Poetry

- (1906). From Old Fields: Poems of the Civil War.

== See also ==
- Bully for Brontosaurus
- Jay Backus Woodworth
