= Cliff Ollier =

Australian geologist, geomorphologist and soil scientist (1931–2025)

Clifford David Ollier (26 October 1931 – 26 September 2025) was an Australian geologist, geomorphologist, soil scientist and academic, who was an emeritus professor and honorary research fellow at the School of Earth and Geographical Sciences University of Western Australia. He previously worked at Australian National University, University of New England, Australia, Canberra University, University of Papua New Guinea, and University of Melbourne.

In the late 1950s he worked on a soil survey in the Northern and Eastern provinces of Uganda.

Throughout his career he was a prolific author, as C. D. Ollier, and he contributed to reference works such as The Oxford Companion to the Earth.

Ollier died on 26 September 2025, at the age of 93.

== Publications ==
- Why the Greenland and Antarctic Ice Sheets are Not Collapsing
- Lysenko and Global Warming, Energy & Environment, 20 (2009), 197–200.
- Volcanoes; (1st ed 1969); (2nd ed 1988)
- The Origin of Mountains with Colin Pain (2000)
- Ancient landforms
