= William Morris Davis =

American geographer, geologist, geomorphologist and meteorologist

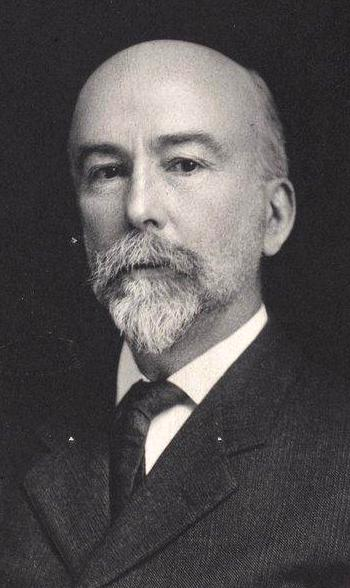
- Born: February 12, 1850; Philadelphia, Pennsylvania
- Died: February 5, 1934 (aged 83); Pasadena, California
- Known for: cycle of erosion; peneplains; often called the "father of American geography"
- Relatives: Edward M. Davis (father); Maria Mott Davis (mother)
- Awards: Hayden Memorial Geological Award (1917); Vega Medal (1920); Penrose Medal (1931)
- Scientific career
- Fields: Geography, Geomorphology, Geology, Meteorology

William Morris Davis (February 12, 1850 – February 5, 1934) was an American geographer, geologist, geomorphologist, and meteorologist, often called the "father of American geography".

He was born into a prominent Quaker family in Philadelphia, Pennsylvania, son of Edward M. Davis and Maria Mott Davis (a daughter of the women's advocate Lucretia Mott). Davis studied geology and geography at Harvard's Lawrence Scientific School and then joined the Harvard sponsored geographic exploration party to the Colorado territory, led by the inaugural Sturgis-Hooper professor of geology, Josiah Dwight Whitney. Wild stories had circulated since soon after the Louisiana Purchase about Rocky Mountains peaks 18,000 feet or higher. The Harvard expedition set out to investigate, and found none, but they did find "14ers" (14,000-plus feet). He graduated from Harvard University in 1869 and received a Master of Mining Engineering in the following year. Davis worked for Nathaniel Shaler as a field assistant, and was later hired to teach at Harvard. Though his legacy lives on in geomorphology, he also advanced theories of scientific racism in his writings about physical geography.

After his first wife died, Davis married Mary M. Wyman from Cambridge, Massachusetts in 1914, and, after her death, he married Lucy L. Tennant from Milton, Massachusetts in 1928, who survived him.

He died in Pasadena, California, shortly before his 84th birthday. His Cambridge home is a National Historic Landmark.

== Scientific career ==
=== Meteorology ===
Davis initially worked in Córdoba, Argentina as a meteorologist for three years and after working as an assistant to Nathaniel Shaler, he became an instructor in geology at Harvard, in 1879. The same year he married Ellen B. Warner from Springfield, Massachusetts. While Davis never completed his PhD, he was appointed to his first full professorship in 1890 and remained in academia and teaching throughout his life.

=== Cycle of erosion theory ===
Davis was a tenacious, as well as keen observer of nature, a master of logical deduction, and a brilliant synthesizer of disparate observations and ideas. From his own field observations and studies made by the original nineteenth-century surveyors of the western United States, he devised his most influential scientific contribution - the "geographical cycle". His theory first defined in his 1889 article, The Rivers and Valleys of Pennsylvania, which was a model of how rivers erode uplifted land to base level, was inspired by the work of Erasmus and Charles Darwin and Jean-Baptiste Lamarck, and it had a strong evolutionary flavor. His cycle of erosion suggests that (larger) rivers have three main stages of development, generally divided into youthful, mature and old-age stages. Each stage has distinct landforms and other properties associated with them, which can occur along the length of a river's upper, middle, and lower course.

Though the cycle of erosion was a crucial early contribution to the development of geomorphology, many of Davis' theories regarding landscape evolution, sometimes termed 'Davisian geomorphology', were heavily criticized by later geomorphologists. When Davis retired from Harvard in 1911, the study of landscape evolution was nearly monopolized by his theories. It was characteristic of Davis to react violently and disdainfully to criticism, particularly to the German criticism in the 1920s headed by Walther Penck; it was also his characteristic to choose to attack the most vulnerable points of that criticism. Since that time, with a less dogmatic approach and greater knowledge, some authors note that Penck's and Davis' ideas have become more compatible and even complementary since the advent of modern tectonic theory. They claim that Davis' ideas are more applicable near active margins where tectonics are "cataclysmic", and Penck's ideas fit better in models of passive margins and continental platforms.

=== Contributions to physical geography and scientific racism ===
Davis was elected to the American Academy of Arts and Sciences in 1884 and the American Philosophical Society in 1899. He was a founder of the Association of American Geographers in 1904, elected to the United States National Academy of Sciences that same year, and heavily involved with the National Geographic Society in its early years, writing a number of articles for the magazine. Davis retired from Harvard in 1911. He served as president of the Geological Society of America in 1911. He was awarded the Patron's Medal of the Royal Geographical Society in 1919.

His textbook, Elementary Physical Geography (1902), includes a chapter entitled "The Distribution of Plants, Animals, and Man," in which Davis details how the physical geography of landscapes influences "the progress of man from the savage toward the civilized state." Davis concludes that "the leading nations of [the European] race are the most advanced peoples in the world" and "few nations among [black, brown, and red] races have made important advances towards civilization." This textbook chapter exemplifies how Davis promulgated theories of scientific racism, and was likely influenced by mentor and colleague Nathaniel Shaler, who published similar views on the subject. Davis borrowed from Darwinian biological concepts and applied these to physical landscapes and climates in a type of Social Darwinistic thought termed "environmental determinism". His work influenced geographer and writer Elsworth Huntington, a student of Davis at Harvard, who attempted to explain differences in human culture by climate and geography, for example comparing communities of British descent in Canada and the Bahamas and suggesting that Anglo Bahamians are slower because of climate and proximity to black people.

== Legacy ==
The valley of Davisdalen in Nathorst Land at Spitsbergen, Svalbard is named after him.

== Works ==
Books:

- Elementary Meteorology (Boston, Ginn & Company, 1893)
- Elementary Physical Geography (Boston, Ginn & Company, 1902)
- Geographical Essays (Boston, Ginn & Company, 1909)
- Articles:
- "Geographic methods in geologic investigations", National Geographic Magazine 1: pp. 11–26 (1888)
- "The Rivers and Valleys of Pennsylvania", National Geographic Magazine 1: pp. 183–253 (1889)
- "The geographical cycle", Geographical Journal, vol. 14, pp. 481–504 (1899). Accessible from JSTOR
- "The Physical Geography of the Lands", Popular Science Monthly 2: pp. 157–170 (1900)
