= Douglas Wilson Johnson =

American geographer and geomorphologist

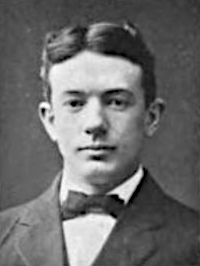
- Born: November 30, 1878; Parkersburg, West Virginia
- Died: February 24, 1944 (aged 65); Sebring, Florida
- Occupations: Geographer, geomorphologist

Douglas Wilson Johnson (1878–1944) was an American geographer and geomorphologist known for his contributions to the understanding of coastal processes and landforms.

== Biography ==
Douglas Wilson Johnson was born in Parkersburg, West Virginia on November 30, 1878. He was a descendant of a slave-holding American family of English roots. Johnson's grandfather freed his slaves and paid for their passage to Liberia after he had become convinced that slavery was against his religious beliefs.

During the First World War, Johnson investigated military geography and geopolitics.

During the negotiations that led to the Treaty of Versailles, Johnson was a member of the American delegation dealing with the question of the new Italian-Austrian border in the Brenner Pass region. He was also a foreign member of Serbian Academy of Sciences, a member of the American Academy of Arts and Sciences, a member of the American Philosophical Society in 1920, and a member of the United States National Academy of Sciences.

He died in Sebring, Florida on February 24, 1944.
