= Base level =

Lowest limit for erosion processes

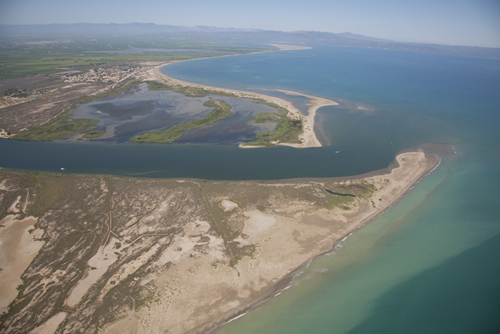
Aerial picture of the Ebro river as it reaches the Mediterranean Sea by the Ebro Delta

In geology and geomorphology a base level is the lower limit for the vertical position of an erosion process. The modern term was introduced by John Wesley Powell in 1875. The term was subsequently appropriated by William Morris Davis who used it in his cycle of erosion theory. The "ultimate base level" is the surface that results from horizontal projection of the sea level under landmasses (the geoid). It is to this base level that topography tends to approach due to erosion, eventually forming a peneplain close to the end of a cycle of erosion.

There are also lesser structural base levels where erosion is delayed by resistant rocks. Examples of this include karst regions underlain by insoluble rock. Base levels may be local when large bodies of water are far from the sea or disconnected from it, as in the case of endorheic basins. An example of this is the Messinian salinity crisis, in which the Mediterranean Sea, closed off from the global ocean, saw a significant proportion of its water dry up. As a result, its base level dropped more than 1000 m below sea level.

The height of a base level also influences the position of deltas and river terraces. Together with river discharge and sediment flux the position of the base level influences the gradient, width and bed conditions in rivers. A relative drop in base level can trigger re-adjustments in river profiles including knickpoint migration and abandonment of terraces leaving them "hanging". Base level fall is also known to result in progradation of deltas and river sediment at lakes or sea. If the base level falls below the continental shelf, rivers may form a plain of braided rivers until headward erosion penetrates enough inland from the shelfbreak.

When base levels are stable or rising rivers may aggrade. Rising base levels may also drown the lower courses of rivers creating rias. This happened in the Nile during the Zanclean flood when its lower course became, in a relatively short time, a large estuary extending up to 900 km inland from the Mediterranean coast.

Base level change may be related to the following factors:

1. Sea level change
2. Tectonic movement
3. River capture
4. Extensive sedimentation
