= Ole Humlum =

Danish geologist (born 1949)

Ole Humlum (born 21 July 1949) is a Danish professor emeritus at the University of Oslo , Department of Geosciences and adjunct professor of physical geography at the University Centre in Svalbard. His academic focus includes glacial and periglacial geomorphology and climatology.

== Education ==
Born near the coast in Jylland, he became interested in geology when he visited the Alps as a teenager and saw the glaciers. He studied natural science at the University of Copenhagen, earning bachelor's degrees in geology, geography, zoology and botany. In 1976, he obtained a M.Sc. in glacial geomorphology and was the same year also awarded a Prize Essay Gold Medal at the University for another study. He earned a Ph.D degree in glacial geomorphology in 1980.

== Career ==
After having held post-doc positions 1980–1983 he became scientific director at the University of Copenhagen Arctic Station near Qeqertarsuaq where he lived for three years. He subsequently worked as assistant professor at the University of Copenhagen from 1986–1999.

He became professor at the University Centre in Svalbard in 1999. In 2003, he became full professor at the University of Oslo, Department of Geosciences. He became a member of the newly founded Norwegian Scientific Academy for Polar Research in 2008.

== Climate change views ==
Humlum is a member of the Norwegian organization Climate Realists (Klimarealistene) . He is active in Norwegian and Danish climate politics, arguing that current climate change is mainly a natural phenomenon. Together with Jan-Erik Solheim and Kjel Stordahl, he published the article "Identifying natural contributions to late Holocene climate change" in Global and Planetary Change in 2011. The article argues that changes in the sun's and moon's influence on the earth may explain most of the historical and current climate change. The theory in the article was opposed by several scientists. He predicted in 2013 that the climate would most likely become colder in the coming 10–15 years; in 2024, Humlum's own report states that "air temperatures in 2024 were highest on record for the instrumental era (since 1850/1880/1979)". In 2013, he wrote another article in Global and Planetary Change where he concluded that carbon dioxide lagged changes in temperature since 1975.

Each year he publishes the report 'The State of the Climate' for the Global Warming Policy Foundation.

Humlum's views on climate change have been criticised in Skeptical Science, where it has been pointed out that Humlum constructs fallacious straw man arguments such as arguing that the attribution of recent climate change to human activity is based on a majority opinion of scientists.

== Selected publications ==
- Humlum, Ole (1 October 1982). "Rock glacier types on Disko, Central West Greenland". Danish Journal of Geography. 82 (1): 59–66. Bibcode:1982GeTid..82...59H. doi:10.1080/00167223.1982.10649152.
- Humlum, Ole (May 1988). "Rock Glacier Appearance Level and Rock Glacier Initiation Line Altitude: A Methodological Approach to the Study of Rock Glaciers". Arctic and Alpine Research. 20 (2): 160–178. Bibcode:1988AARes..20..160H. doi:10.1080/00040851.1988.12002662.
- Humlum, Ole (October 1996). "Origin of rock glaciers: Observations from Mellemfjord, Disko Island, Central West Greenland". Permafrost and Periglacial Processes. 7 (4): 361–380. doi:10.1002/(SICI)1099-1530(199610)7:4<361::AID-PPP227>3.0.CO;2-4.
- Humlum, Ole (1998). "The climatic significance of rock glaciers". Permafrost and Periglacial Processes. 9 (4): 375–395. doi:10.1002/(SICI)1099-1530(199810/12)9:4<375::AID-PPP301>3.0.CO;2-0.
- Humlum, Ole (October 2000). "The geomorphic significance of rock glaciers: estimates of rock glacier debris volumes and headwall recession rates in West Greenland". Geomorphology. 35 (1–2): 41–67. Bibcode:2000Geomo..35...41H. doi:10.1016/S0169-555X(00)00022-2.
- Humlum, Ole (January 2002). "Modelling late 20th-century precipitation in Nordenskiold Land, Svalbard, by geomorphic means". Norwegian Journal of Geography. 56 (2): 96–103. Bibcode:2002NGTid..56...96H. doi:10.1080/002919502760056413.
- Humlum, Ole; Instanes, Arne; Sollid, Johan Ludwig (16 December 2016). "Permafrost in Svalbard: a review of research history, climatic background and engineering challenges". Polar Research. 23 (2): 191–215. doi:10.3402/polar.v22i2.6455.
- Humlum, Ole; Elberling, Bo; Hormes, Anne; Fjordheim, Kristine; Hansen, Odd Harald; Heinemeier, Jan (April 2005). "Late-Holocene glacier growth in Svalbard, documented by subglacial relict vegetation and living soil microbes". The Holocene. 15 (3): 396–407. Bibcode:2005Holoc..15..396H. doi:10.1191/0959683605hl817rp.
- Humlum, Ole; Christiansen, Hanne H.; Juliussen, Håvard (22 February 2007). "Avalanche-derived rock glaciers in Svalbard". Permafrost and Periglacial Processes. 18 (1): 75–88. Bibcode:2007PPPr...18...75H. doi:10.1002/ppp.580.
- Harris, Charles; Arenson, Lukas U.; Christiansen, Hanne H.; Etzelmüller, Bernd; Frauenfelder, Regula; Gruber, Stephan; Haeberli, Wilfried; Hauck, Christian; Hölzle, Martin; Humlum, Ole; Isaksen, Ketil; Kääb, Andreas; Kern-Lütschg, Martina A.; Lehning, Michael; Matsuoka, Norikazu; Murton, Julian B.; Nötzli, Jeanette; Phillips, Marcia; Ross, Neil; Seppälä, Matti; Springman, Sarah M.; Vonder Mühll, Daniel (February 2009). "Permafrost and climate in Europe: Monitoring and modelling thermal, geomorphological and geotechnical responses" (PDF). Earth-Science Reviews. 92 (3–4): 117–171. Bibcode:2009ESRv...92..117H. doi:10.1016/j.earscirev.2008.12.002.
- Humlum, Ole (2009). Det ustyrlige klima: eksperternes vej fra forskere til flagellanter [The unruly climate: the experts' path from scientists to flagellants] (in Danish). Trykkefrihedsselskabets Bibliotek. ISBN 978-87-92417-08-4. OCLC 758139209.
- Humlum, Ole; Solheim, Jan-Erik; Stordahl, Kjell (October 2011). "Identifying natural contributions to late Holocene climate change". Global and Planetary Change. 79 (1–2): 145–156. Bibcode:2011GPC....79..145H. doi:10.1016/j.gloplacha.2011.09.005.
- Humlum, Ole; Stordahl, Kjell; Solheim, Jan-Erik (January 2013). "The phase relation between atmospheric carbon dioxide and global temperature". Global and Planetary Change. 100: 51–69. Bibcode:2013GPC...100...51H. doi:10.1016/j.gloplacha.2012.08.008.
- Strand, Sarah M.; Christiansen, Hanne H.; Johansson, Margareta; Åkerman, Jonas; Humlum, Ole (14 October 2020). "Active layer thickening and controls on interannual variability in the Nordic Arctic compared to the circum-Arctic". Permafrost and Periglacial Processes. 32 (1): 47–58. doi:10.1002/ppp.2088. ISSN 1045-6740 – via Wiley Online Library.
- Bertone, Aldo; Barboux, Chloé; Bodin, Xavier; Bolch, Tobias; Brardinoni, Francesco; Caduff, Rafael; Christiansen, Hanne H.; Darrow, Margaret M.; Delaloye, Reynald; Etzelmüller, Bernd; Humlum, Ole; Lambiel, Christophe; Lilleøren, Karianne S.; Mair, Volkmar; Pellegrinon, Gabriel; Rouyet, Line; Ruiz, Lucas; Strozzi, Tazio (14 July 2022). "Incorporating InSAR kinematics into rock glacier inventories: insights from 11 regions worldwide". The Cryosphere. 16 (7): 2769–2792. Bibcode:2022TCry...16.2769B. doi:10.5194/tc-16-2769-2022. hdl:11585/893331. ISSN 1994-0424 – via Copernicus Publications.
- Soon, Willie; Connolly, Ronan; Connolly, Michael; Akasofu, Syun-Ichi; Baliunas, Sallie; Berglund, Johan; Bianchini, Antonio; Briggs, William; Butler, C.; Cionco, Rodolfo; Crok, Marcel; Elias, Ana; Fedorov, Valery; Gervais, François; Harde, Hermann; Henry, Gregory W.; Hoyt, Douglas V.; Humlum, Ole; Legates, David R.; Lupo, Anthony R.; Maruyama, Shigenori; Moore, Patrick; Ogurtsov, Maxim; ÓhAiseadha, Coilín; Oliveira, Marcos G.; Park, Seok-Soon; Qiu, Shican; Quinn, Gerré; Scafetta, Nicola; Solheim, Jan-Erik; Steele, Jim; Szarka, László; Tanaka, Hiroshi L.; Taylor, Mitchell K.; Vahrenholt, Fritz; Velasco Herrera, Víctor M.; Zhang, Weijia (28 August 2023). "The Detection and Attribution of Northern Hemisphere Land Surface Warming (1850–2018) in Terms of Human and Natural Factors: Challenges of Inadequate Data". Climate. 11 (9): 179. Bibcode:2023Clim...11..179S. doi:10.3390/cli11090179. hdl:10037/31801. ISSN 2225-1154.
