= Aleksandr Popov (geologist) =

Aleksandr Iosifovich Popov (Russian: Алекса́ндр Ио́сифович Попо́в; 7 June 1913 in Dorpat, Governorate of Livonia, Russian Empire – 23 April 1993 in Moscow, Russia) was a Soviet permafrost researcher at the Moscow State University. He served as head of the Department of Cryolithology and Glaciology. Popov was a member of the International Commission on Periglacial Morphology of the International Geographical Union. He organized and led numerous expeditions to investigate permafrost and deep seasonal freezing in the Soviet Union. Popov edited the geocryological map of the Soviet Union that was published in 1986.

== See also ==
- Jan Dylik
- Konstantin Markov
