= Head (geology) =

Term in geology that describes deposits

Head describes deposits consisting of fragmented material which, following weathering, have moved downslope through a process of solifluction. The term has been used by British geologists since the middle of the 19th century to describe such material in a range of different settings from flat hilltops to the bottoms of valleys. Areas identified as head include deposits of aeolian origin such as blown sand and loess, slope deposits such as gelifluctates and solifluctates, and recently eroded soil material, called colluvium. With geologists becoming more interested in studying the near-surface environment and its related processes, the term head is becoming obsolete.

A related term is 'combe (or coombe) rock', descriptive of a body of chalk and flint fragments contained within a mass of chalky earth typically found on the chalk downlands of south-east England and resulting from freeze-thaw processes. Where the mass is also soliflucted, it is considered a variety of head.

Though its earliest use is attributed to De la Beche in 1839 he mentions that in 1837 Mr. Trevelyn of Guernsey observed “ a bed of disintegrated granite, about three feet thick, mixed with angular fragments, thus reminding us of the head of angular fragments so commonly seen in Cornwall and Devon.“

== Related concepts ==
- Diamicton - any poorly sorted terrigenous sedimentary deposit.
- Colluvium - a type of diamicton deposited by down slope non-fluvial processes.
- Till - diamicton deposited specifically by the underneath of a glacier.
- Olistostrome - the submarine counterpart to terrigenous diamicton.
