= Loch Salachaidh =

Mountain loch in Scotland

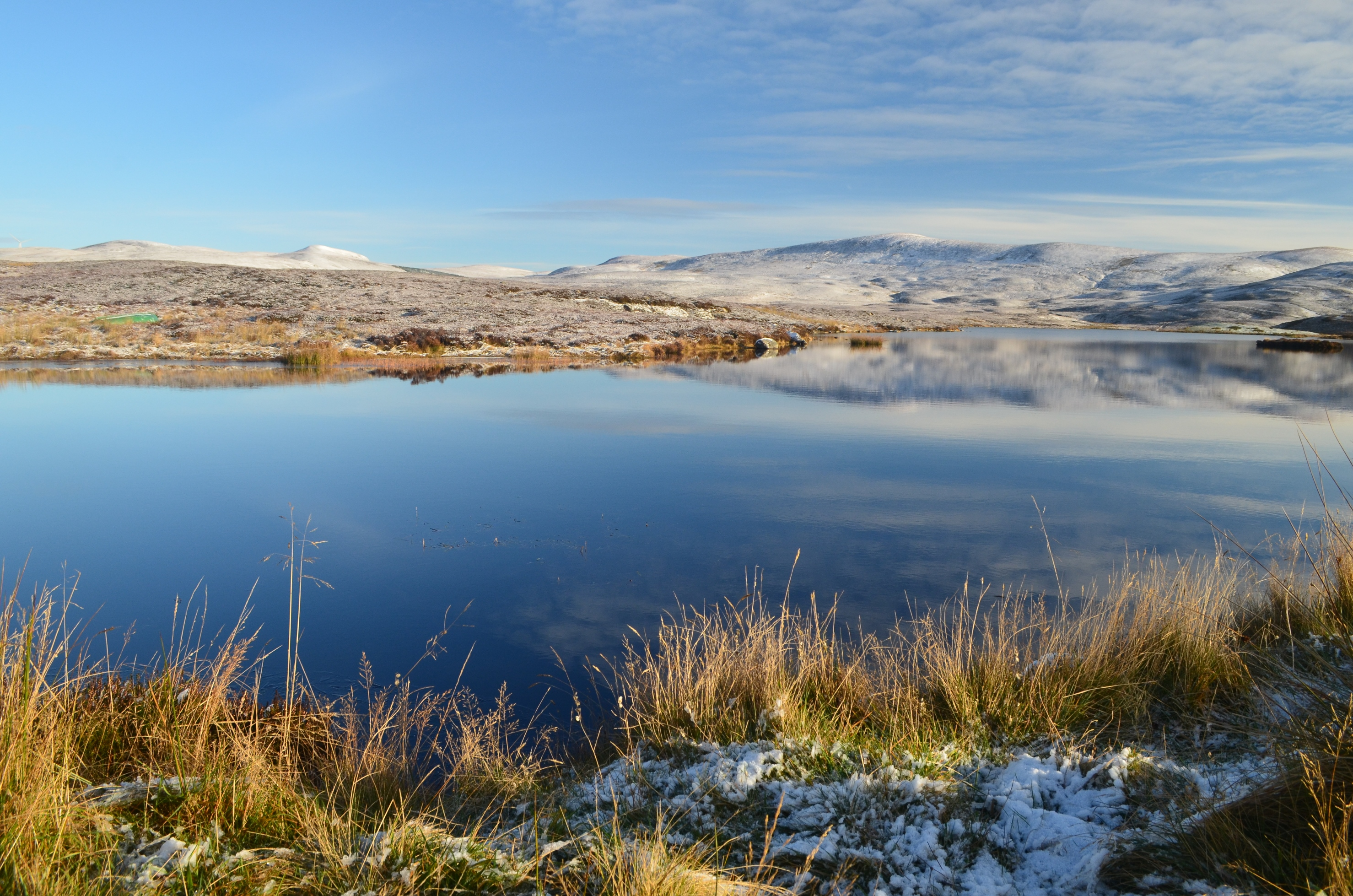
- Loch Salachaidh, from the forestry track on its western shore

- Location within Sutherland
- Location: Scottish Highlands
- Coordinates: 58°00′18.7″N 4°05′58.7″W
- Primary outflows: Allt Loch an t-Salachaidh
- Basin countries: Scotland, United Kingdom
- Max. length: 977 m (3,205 ft)
- Max. width: 235 m (771 ft)
- Surface elevation: 170 m (560 ft)
- Islands: 1

Loch Salachaidh is a remote mountain loch in Sutherland, Scotland, situated 1.7km east of Rogart. It sits in a bed of psammite, surrounded by peat bogs and diamicton.

The loch's name likely derives from the Scottish Gaelic salach, meaning "dirty" i.e. "Dirty Loch".

Loch Salachaidh was the site of a clan battle c. 1517, between the MacKays of Strathnaver and the Murrays of Abirsors, with multiple fatalities including two chieftains.

A small ruined farmstead named Kinloch ("Head of the Loch") has sat at the loch's eastern end since at least the 1870s. It is unclear when it was abandoned, although it may have been during the Sutherland Clearances.
