= Permafrost and Periglacial Processes =

- Discipline: Periglacial geomorphology, permafrost research
- Language: English
- Edited by: Mauro Guglielmin

Publication details
- History: 1990—present
- Publisher: John Wiley & Sons
- Frequency: Quarterly
- Impact factor: 4.368 (2020)

Standard abbreviations
- ISO 4: Permafr. Periglac. Process.

Indexing
- CODEN: PEPPED
- ISSN: 1045-6740 (print); 1099-1530 (web)
- LCCN: 91660063
- OCLC no.: 20213362

Links
- Journal homepage; Online access; Online archive

Permafrost and Periglacial Processes is a quarterly peer-reviewed scientific journal covering research on permafrost and periglacial geomorphology. It covers the subject from various points of views including engineering, hydrology, process geomorphology, and quaternary geology. It is the official journal of the International Permafrost Association and is published by John Wiley & Sons. The editor-in-chief is Mauro Guglielmin (Insubria University, Italy). According to the Journal Citation Reports, the journal has a 2020 impact factor of 4.368.

== See also ==
- Biuletyn Peryglacjalny
