= Jan Dylik =

Polish geography professor (1905–1973)

- Born: 19 June 1905; Łódź, Poland
- Died: 6 June 1973 (aged 67); Łódź, Poland
- Citizenship: Poland
- Education: Jagiellonian University; Adam Mickiewicz University in Poznań
- Known for: Periglacial geomorphology
- Scientific career
- Fields: Geomorphology
- Workplaces: University of Łódź

Jan Dylik (19 June 1905 – 6 June 1973) was a Polish geography professor at the University of Łódź. He was born in Łódź on 19 June 1905. In 1925 he begain post-secondary studies at Jagiellonian University. He then went on to attend Adam Mickiewicz University in Poznań to pursue research and a doctoral degree. He found himself fascinated by the differences in geology between the Greater Poland Voivodeship and the Łódź Voivodeship. He collaborated with Stanisław Lencewicz on a project to analyze the Łódź region's geology and geomorphology. The resulting paper was published in 1927, and for many years was considered the only source of information on the geology of Łódź. From 1928-1930, while still balancing the responsibilities of research, he worked as an assistant in the National Museum of Archaeology in Poland. In 1930, he completed his doctoral degree for a dissertation on Stone Age settlements in the Warta River Gorge. After obtaining his doctoral degree, Dylik sought funding from the National Culture Fund of Poland in order to travel and study abroad. In 1932, funding was granted for a research trip to Austria, Germany, Denmark, and Sweden. The research obtained during this trip was the basis for a 1935 paper he published on Neolithic-era Settlements in the Northern Vienna Basin. This trip inspired him to travel yet again, and in 1934, another grant was offered for a research trip to Sweden, Finland, Estonia, and Latvia. After his research trip in 1934, he served on the International Geographic Congress in Warsaw as the Secretary of the Section on Prehistoric and Historical Geography, where he authored and presented a paper on the geographical location of prehistoric settlements and the historic development of ecumenism in western Poland. This marked the height of Dylik's association with archaeology, as shortly after this period, his career shifted away from anthropological geography toward pure geology. He still maintained close ties with his contacts in the field of archaeology, and continued to collaborate with them for future research. He also forever remained an archaeologist at heart in some regards, keeping his habit of treating geological sites with the same deal of care and meticulousness as if they were archaeological dig sites.

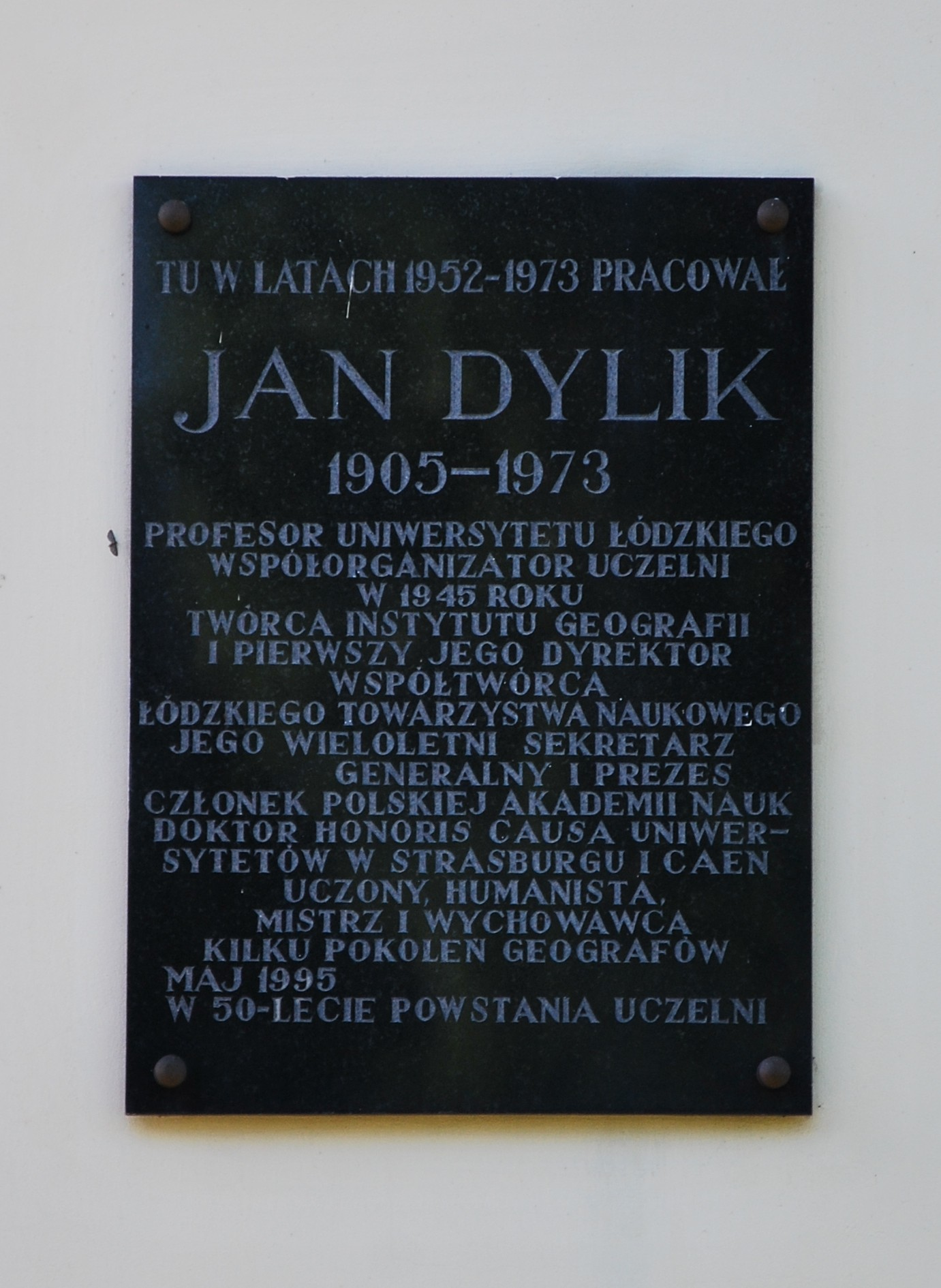
Plaque Commemorating Jan Dylik' Contributions to the World

In 1934, Dylik finally returned to Łódź, and from 1935 to the outbreak of World War II, he researched and lectured at the Łódź branch of the Free Polish University, which later became the University of Łódź. He primarily focused on geological surveys of the local region surrounding Łódź. However, parts of his work were destroyed when war broke out in 1939. When German forces occupied Poland, Dylik and his family were displaced, and eventually ended up in Warsaw. During this time, much of the research and materials Dylik procured during his previous career was lost. While battling harsh living conditions, Dylik had to work as an unskilled laborer to earn a living, but he never gave up his love for academia. In 1942 he lectured in anthropogeography and economic geography at the University of Warsaw. There, he even wrote a dissertation and part of a textbook. Unfortunately, all the works were destroyed in the Warsaw Uprising in 1944. Remaining loyal to his country, he participated in the Polish Resistance in Warsaw. This was reflected in his academic work, as during the occupation, he began compiling geographical information on East Prussia, Western Pomerania, Lubusz Land, and Lower Silesia, historically and culturally significant parts of Poland that were lost to war and invasion. This was an effort to prepare for returning and reincorporating said lands back into post-war Poland, in hopes that Poland could become stronger and more united in the future. This compilation of geographical, historical, and economic research survived, and made its way into a book titled "Geografia Ziem Odzyskanych," or "Geography of Recovered Land" in 1946.

Immediately after central Poland was no longer under German occupation, Dylik returned to Łódź to begin working at the University of Łódź, which was established in 1945 from the remnants of the Łódź branch of the Free Polish University. In 1947 he achieved the title of associate professor. In 1950, he established the Department of Geography and was appointed the head of the department. By 1956 he became a full professor. From there he exercised an enormous influence in the development of periglacial geomorphology. He led the Periglacial Commission of the International Geographical Union from 1952 to 1972. He established the journal Biuletyn Peryglacjalny in 1954 and served as its editor-in-chief until 1972. In addition to his role in the Periglacial Commission and Biuletyn Peryglacjalny he had extensive contacts among Eastern Bloc scientists. In particular Jan Dylik had regular contact with Soviet scientists such as Konstantin Markov and Aleksandr Popov. Knowing Russian allowed Dylik to overcome the language barrier and access the rich Soviet literature on permafrost. From Dylik's links with the Soviet Union a regular student exchange between the University of Łódź and Moscow State University emerged. In 1963, Dylik was awarded the "Award of the City of Łódź for achievements in the field of natural sciences".

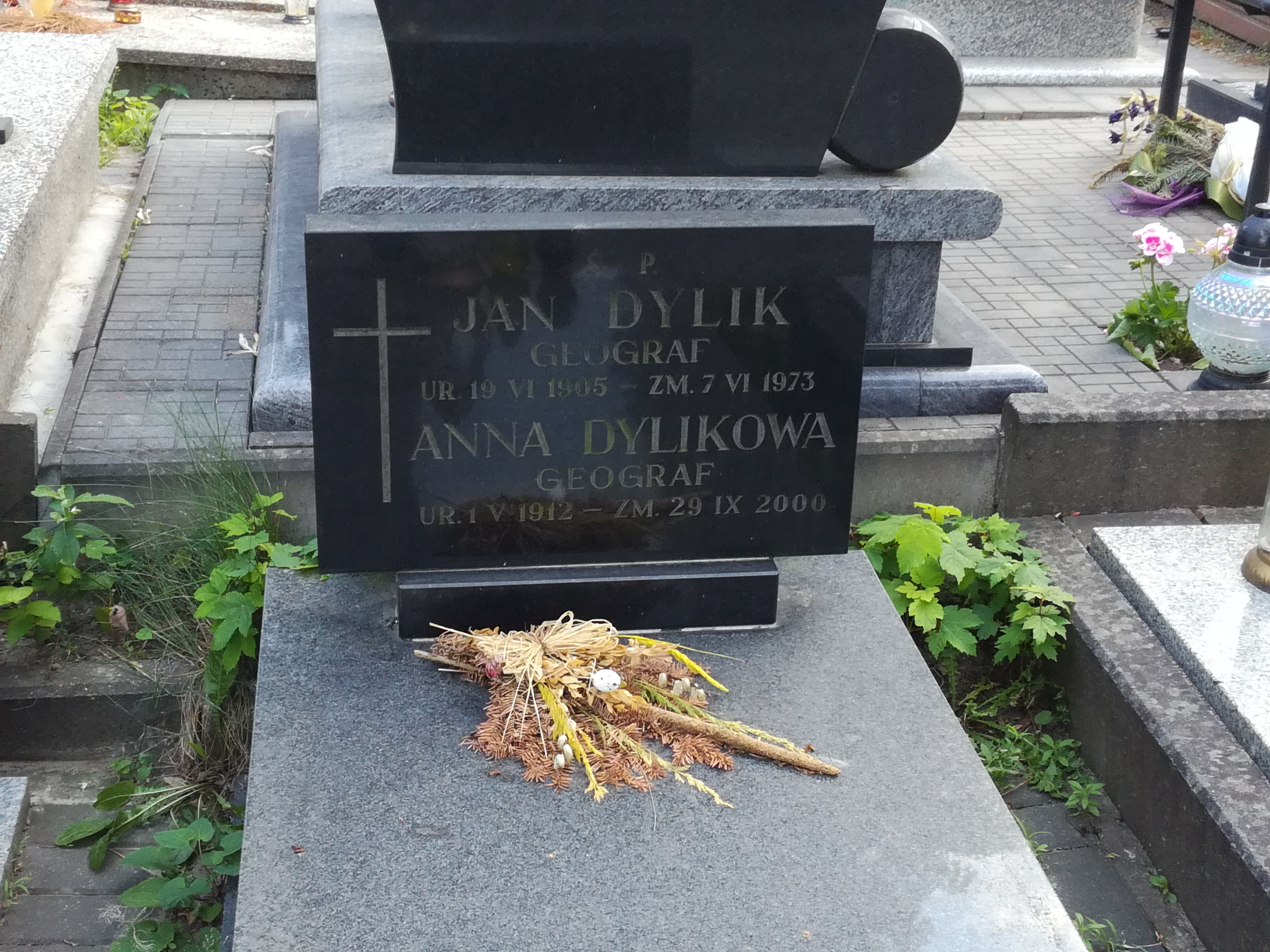
Jan Dylik's place of burial

On June 7, 1973, a few days before turning 68, Jan Dylik suffered a heart attack and died as a result. He leaves behind a large legacy on Polish academia as well as the international geomorphology community. He is buried at the Old Cemetery in Łódź.
