= Johan Gunnar Andersson =

Swedish archaeologist (1874–1960)

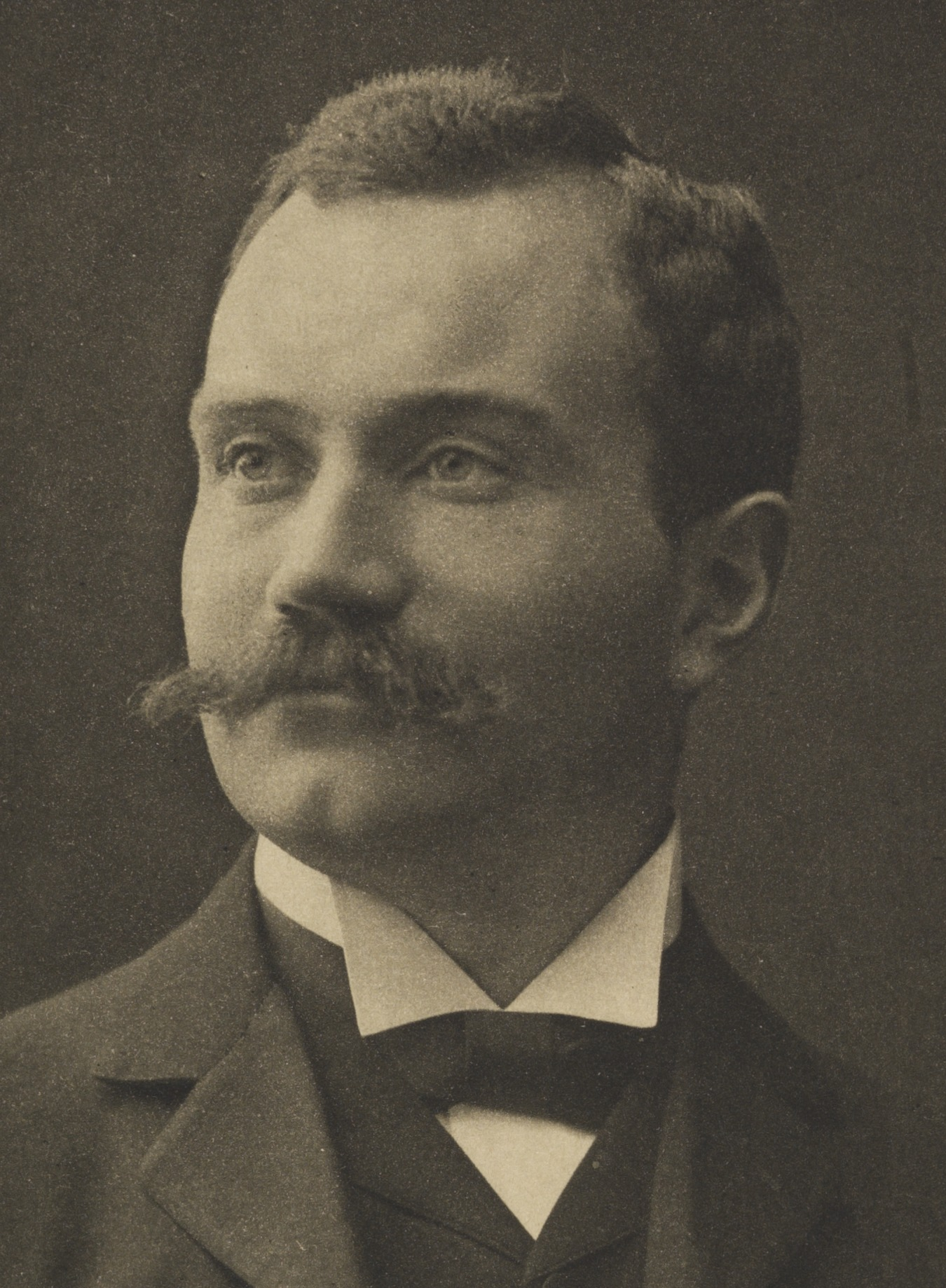
- Johan Gunnar Andersson circa 1906.
- Born: 3 July 1874; Närke, Sweden
- Died: 29 October 1960 (aged 86); Stockholm, Sweden
- Education: Uppsala University
- Known for: Chinese archaeology Peking Man; Solifluction
- Awards: Vega Medal (1904)
- Scientific career
- Fields: Archaeology; Geomorphology; Paleantology

Chinese name
- Chinese: 安特生
Transcriptions
Standard Mandarin
- Hanyu Pinyin: Ān Tèshēng

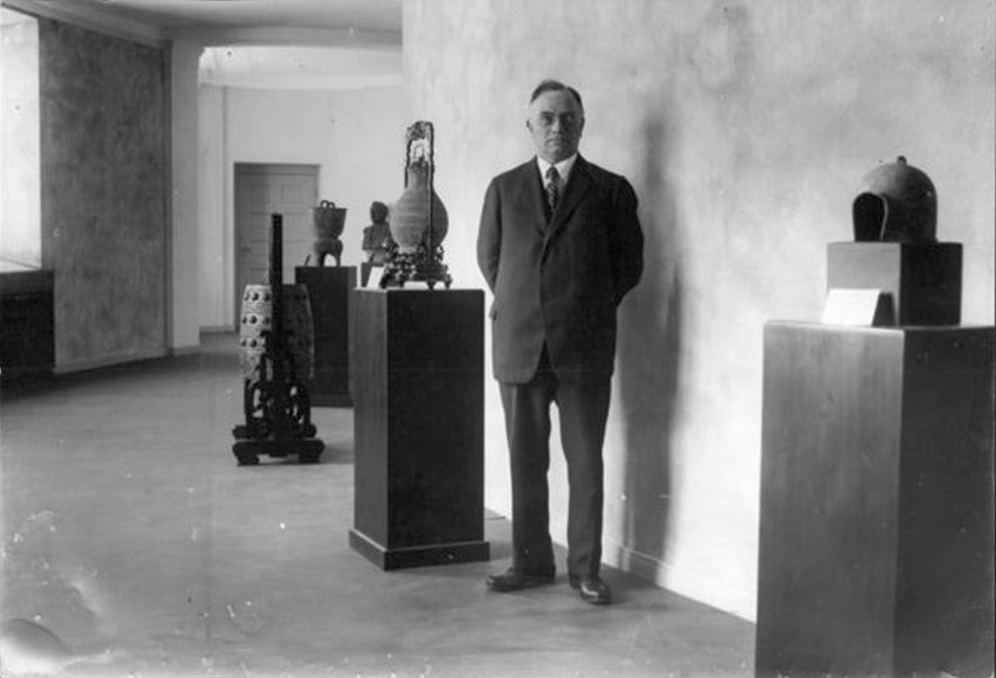
Professor Johan Gunnar Andersson on 31 August 1927

Johan Gunnar Andersson (3 July 1874 – 29 October 1960) was a Swedish archaeologist, geomorphologist, and paleontologist who was closely associated with the beginnings of Chinese archaeology in the 1920s, including the discovery of the Peking Man.

== Early life and polar research ==
After studies at Uppsala University, and research in the polar regions, Andersson served as Director of Sweden's National Geological Survey.

He participated in the Swedish Antarctic Expedition of 1901 to 1903 (on the ship Antarctic).

His work on the Falkland Islands and the Bjørnøya, where he first coined the term solifluction, influenced Walery Łoziński's creation of the concept of periglaciation in 1909.

== Chinese archaeology ==
In 1914, Andersson was invited to China as a mining adviser to the Chinese government. His affiliation was with China's National Geological Survey (Dizhi diaochasuo) which was organized and led by the Chinese scholar Ding Wenjiang (V.K. Ting) and his colleague Wong Wen-hao (Pinyin: Weng Wenhao). During this time, Andersson assisted in the training of China's first generation of geologists, and he also made numerous discoveries of iron ore and other natural resources, as well as geological and paleontological discoveries.

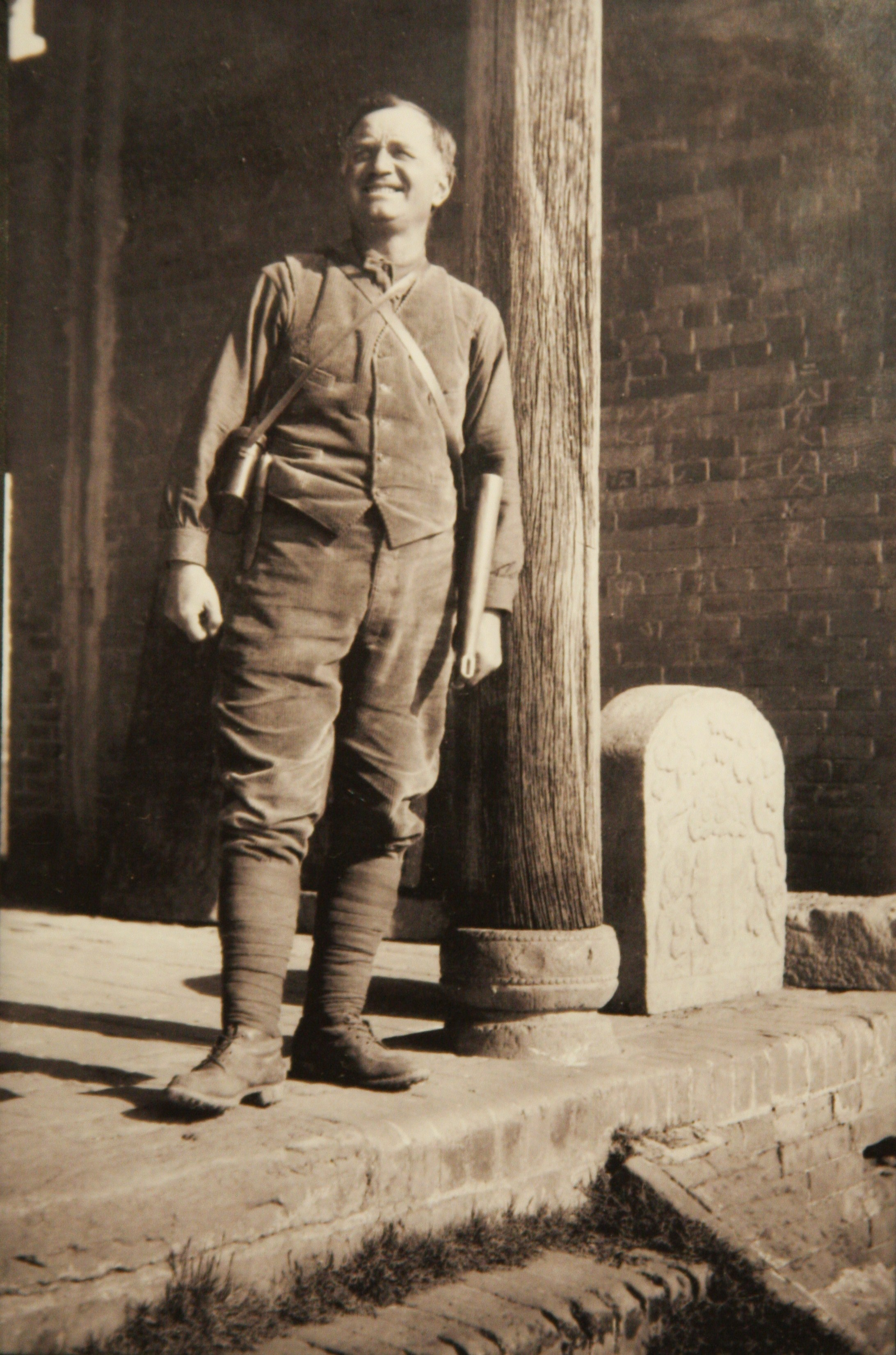
Mr. Andersson in China, 1920

Andersson paid his first visit to Zhoukoudian in 1918 drawn to an area called "Chicken Bone Hill" by locals who had misidentified the rodent fossils found in abundance there. He returned in 1921 and local quarrymen took him to Dragon Bone Hill, where he identified a quartz sample that was not native to the area. Realising that the presence of non-native quartz may indicate the presence of prehistoric man, he sent his assistant, Otto Zdansky to the area and ordered him to excavate it. Zdansky returned and conducted further excavations in 1923 and a large amount of material was shipped to Uppsala for analysis. Eventually in 1926, on the occasion of a visit by the Swedish Prince to Beijing, Andersson announced the discovery of two human teeth. These were later identified as being the first finds of the Peking Man.

In collaboration with Chinese colleagues such as Yuan Fuli and others, he then discovered prehistoric Neolithic remains in central China's Henan Province, along the Yellow River. The remains were named the Yangshao culture after the village where they were first excavated, in 1921. This discovery was another extremely important breakthrough, because the prehistory of what is now China had not yet been investigated in scientific archaeological excavations and the Yangshao and other prehistoric cultures were completely unknown (they had never been mentioned in any historical documents, and they had never been recognized and investigated).

The decoration of Yangshao pottery was similar to the decoration of Anau and Tripolje pottery in Central Asia and Europe, and both of them have similar spiral patterns. Therefore, Andersson hypothesized that Chinese painted pottery could have spread from the west. He believed that the Ancient China and Central Asia could have passed through Xinjiang and Gansu regions.

In order to prove the hypothesis of a "West Origin", Andersson, in his capacity as a staff member of China's National Geological Survey, conducted archaeological excavations in the provinces of Gansu and Qinghai, in the following years, 1923–24, again in collaboration with his Chinese colleagues, and he published numerous books and scientific papers on Chinese archaeology, many in the Bulletin of the Museum of Far Eastern Antiquities, which he founded and launched in 1929, and in it, he published his most significant scientific reports on his own work, including the book Preliminary Report on Archaeological Research in Kansu published in 1925.

Andersson's archaeological activities and the view of Chinese culture which originated in the west caused a great uproar in China. The excavations by Chinese archaeologists, such as Li Ji, Fu Sinian, and Liang Siyong, based on their excavations in Yinxu and Chengziya, indicated an independent root for Chinese civilization. Despite this fact, it can be said that Andersson paved the way for the foundation of modern Chinese archaeology.

Andersson's most well-known book about his time in China is Den gula jordens barn, 1932, translated into several languages, including English (as Children of the Yellow Earth, 1934, reprinted in 1973), Japanese, and Korean. For an extensive bibliography of Andersson's works, and a comprehensive discussion of his and his colleagues' archaeological research in China, see M. Fiskesjö and Chen Xingcan, China before China: Johan Gunnar Andersson, Ding Wenjiang, and the Discovery of China's Prehistory. Stockholm: Museum of Far Eastern Antiquities [Östasiatiska museet], 2004.

In 1926, Andersson founded the Museum of Far Eastern Antiquities in Stockholm, Sweden (Swedish: Östasiatiska museet), a national museum established to house the Swedish part of the collections from these first-ever scientific archaeological excavations in China. Andersson served as the director of the MFEA until he was succeeded in 1939 by the famous Swedish Sinologist Bernhard Karlgren.

== Collection ==
Selections of the Swedish portion of the materials is on display at the MFEA in a new permanent exhibit launched 2004. The Chinese part of the Andersson collections, according to a bilateral Sino-Swedish agreement, was returned by him to the Chinese government in seven shipments, 1927–1936. The first shipments were sent by Andersson to Peking, and the last ones to Nanjing, which had become the new capital of China. An exhibit with these objects was mounted at the new National Geological Survey complex in Nanjing, where Andersson saw them in 1937, the last time they were reported seen by anyone. The last documentary evidence of these objects was a 1948 Visitors Guide to the Geological Survey museum in Nanjing, which listed Andersson's Yangshao artefacts among the exhibits.

The objects were long thought to be irretrievably lost in the civil war that followed, until 2002. After major renovations at the Geological Museum of China, the successor to the Geological Survey's museum, staff found three crates of ceramic vessels and fragments while re-organising items in storage. Following contact with the Museum of Far Eastern Antiquities (Östasiatiska Museet) in Stockholm, it was confirmed that these were indeed left from Andersson's excavations. In 2006, these objects featured in an exhibition at the Geological Museum on the occasion of its 90th anniversary, celebrating the lives and work of Andersson and its other founders. In 2007, the Geological Museum of China published a documentary film (see review and discussion in Fiskesjö 2010).

Still, as of 2010, the vast majority of the objects returned to China by Andersson remain lost. This includes a spectacular and unique human-faced ceramic shaman head (see illustration in Fiskesjö and Chen 2004, repeated in Fiskesjö 2010), and numerous spectacular painted ceramic vessels. Even though similar such ceramics have been excavated since Andersson's time by Chinese archaeologists, these lost collections hold a special interest and value since they derive from the first scientific archaeological excavations in China. It is possible they remain in Nanjing, but despite investigations by several competent parties (Andersson's sending lists have been copied by the Museum of Far Eastern Antiquities to major institutions for cultural heritage and archaeology in China), they have not been relocated, and their whereabouts remains unknown.

== See also ==
- Andersson Island
- Andersson Nunatak

== Notes, references and sources ==
Notes and references

Sources

- Fiskesjö, Magnus and Chen Xingcan. China before China: Johan Gunnar Andersson, Ding Wenjiang, and the Discovery of China's Prehistory. Stockholm: Östasiatiska museet, 2004. ISBN 91-970616-3-8. (With an extensive bibliography of Andersson's works)
- Fiskesjö, Magnus. "The Reappearance of Yangshao? Reflections on unmourned artifacts." (Review essay, on the 2007 Chinese documentary 'Cutting through the fog of history: The re-appearance of the Yangshao cultural relics'). In China Heritage Quarterly 23, (September 2010): http://www.chinaheritagequarterly.org/scholarship.php?searchterm=023_yangshao.inc&issue=023
- Fiskesjö, Magnus. "Science across borders: Johan Gunnar Andersson and Ding Wenjiang." In: Stevan Harrell, Charles McKhann, Margaret Swain and Denise M. Glover, eds., _Explorers and Scientists in China's Borderlands, 1880-1950_. Seattle: University of Washington Press, 2011, pp. 240–66. ISBN 9780295991177. (In-depth discussion of Ding Wenjiang's and Andersson's lives and careers as they intersected with each other, with science in China, and in particular the introduction of modern scientific archaeology in China in the early 20th century.)
