= Trude Storelvmo =

Norwegian meteorologist

- Education: University of Oslo
- Scientific career
- Workplaces: University of Oslo; Yale University; ETH Zurich

Trude Storelvmo is a Norwegian meteorologist who is a professor at the University of Oslo. She specializes in atmospheric science and studies the impact of aerosols and clouds on the climate of the Earth. She was awarded a European Research Council Starting Grant in 2018. She serves as editor-in-chief of Global and Planetary Change.

== Early life and education ==
Storelvmo earned her doctorate from the University of Oslo's Department of Geosciences in 2006. After completing her PhD, she moved to Switzerland where she worked as a postdoctoral researcher at the ETH Zurich from 2007 to 2009.

== Research and career ==
Storelvmo was appointed to the faculty at Yale University in 2010, where she was an assistant and then associate professor for eight years. She returned to Norway in 2018, when she was appointed professor of meteorology and oceanography at the University of Oslo. That year Storelvmo was awarded a European Research Council Starting Grant. Her research considers mixed-phase clouds and their role in weather and climate. Mixed-phase clouds can contain both liquid and ice.

Storelvmo contributed to the IPCC Sixth Assessment Report, and is an editor-in-chief of Global and Planetary Change.

== Awards and honors ==
- 2015 National Science Foundation CAREER Award
- 2017 American Meteorological Society Young Scientist award
- 2020 University of Oslo Young Researcher award
- 2025 inductee to the Norwegian Academy of Science and Letters

== Selected publications ==
- T. C. Bond; S. J. Doherty; D. W. Fahey; et al. (6 June 2013). "Bounding the role of black carbon in the climate system: A scientific assessment". Journal of Geophysical Research: Atmospheres. 118 (11): 5380–5552. Bibcode:2013JGRD..118.5380B. doi:10.1002/jgrd.50171. ISSN 2169-897X. Wikidata Q55879806.
- Ivy Tan; Trude Storelvmo; Mark D. Zelinka (1 April 2016). "Observational constraints on mixed-phase clouds imply higher climate sensitivity". Science. 352 (6282): 224–227. Bibcode:2016Sci...352..224T. doi:10.1126/science.aad5300. ISSN 0036-8075. PMID 27124459. Wikidata Q58258636.
- I.S.A. Isaksen; C. Granier; G. Myhre; et al. (October 2009). "Atmospheric composition change: Climate–Chemistry interactions". Atmospheric Environment. 43 (33): 5138–5192. Bibcode:2009AtmEn..43.5138I. doi:10.1016/j.atmosenv.2009.08.003. ISSN 1352-2310. Wikidata Q58072952.
