= Walery Łoziński =

Polish geographer and soil scientist (1880–1944)

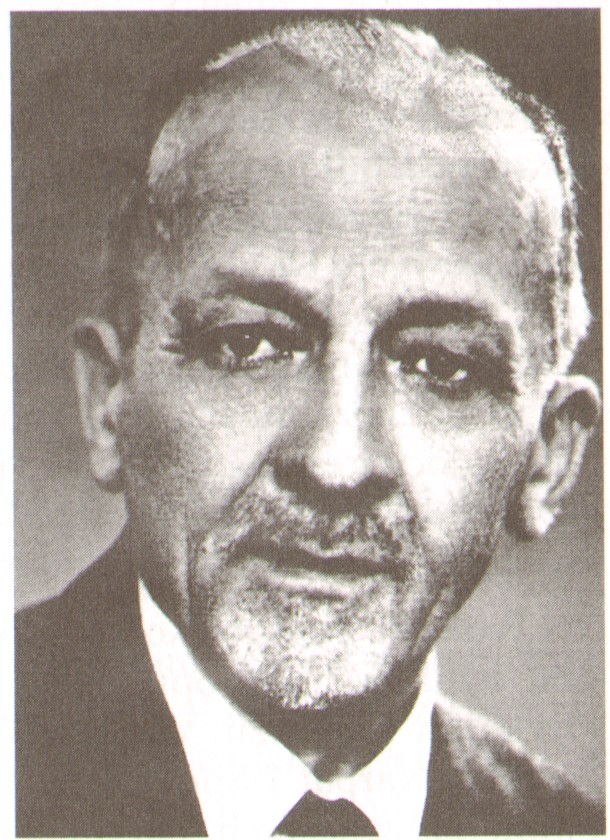
- Born: 3 January 1880; Lviv, Austro-Hungarian Empire
- Died: 1944; Kraków, Poland
- Citizenship: Poland
- Education: Lviv University
- Known for: Periglacial geomorphology
- Scientific career
- Fields: Geomorphology
- Workplaces: Jagiellonian University

Walery Władysław Daniel Łoziński (1880–1944) was a Polish geographer, geomorphologist and soil scientist known for introducing the concept of periglaciation into geomorphology in 1909. Łoziński extended the work of Swedish geologist Johan Gunnar Andersson who had written about periglacial phenomena in Bjørnøya and the Falkland Islands. The concept of "periglaciation" was the subject of an intensive discussion at the 1910 International Geological Congress held in Stockholm. Walery Łoziński was, among others, the editor of the "Gazeta Lwowska".
