= Cape Markov =

Ice cape in Enderby Land, Antarctica

Cape Markov (66°46′S 50°16′E) is an ice cape on the east side of Amundsen Bay, situated 7 nautical miles (13 km) west of Mount Riiser-Larsen in Enderby Land, Antarctica. It was named by the Soviet Antarctic Expedition, 1961–62, for K.K. Markov, professor of geography at Moscow State University, and the author of a number of reports on Antarctica.
