= Gelifluction =

Gelifluction, very similar to solifluction, is the seasonal freeze-thaw action upon waterlogging topsoils which induces downslope movement. Gelifluction is prominent in periglacial regions where snow falls during six to eight months of the year. In spring, the snow and ice melt, and the landscape is effectively inundated with half a year's worth of rainfall in the space of a couple of days. The top soil becomes waterlogged, and flows like a liquid. Because the wet soil behaves like a fluid, gelifluction is a form of mass movement that can occur on slopes with a slope angle of less than half a degree.

== Landforms ==
The most distinctive landforms created by gelifluction include gelifluction lobes and gelifluction benches. The former refer to tongue-shaped deposits of geliflucted material orientated downslope that tend to form on slopes of between 10° and 20°, whereas the latter refer to terrace-like deposits forming on gentler slopes with a long axis running parallel to the slope contour. Gelifluction lobes can be further subdivided into either stone-banked or turf-banked lobes depending on vegetation cover.

A lobe is usually measured in terms of its front (riser) and its length upslope (tread); gelifluction lobes typically have risers of up to 5 metres (16 ft) and treads of up to 50 metres (160 ft).
