= Solifluction =

Freeze-thaw mass wasting slope processes

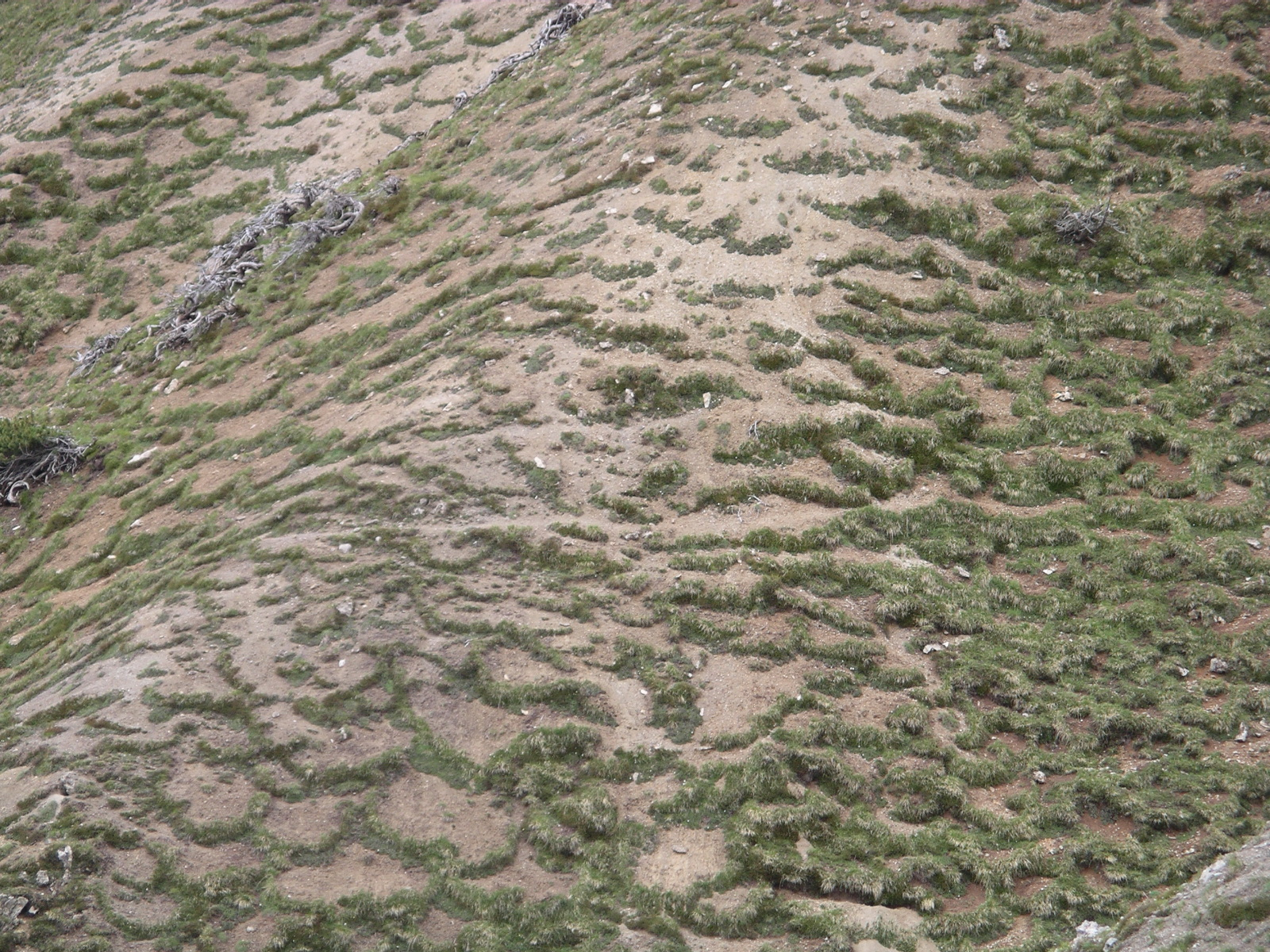
Garland-like solifluction formed in the Swiss National Park

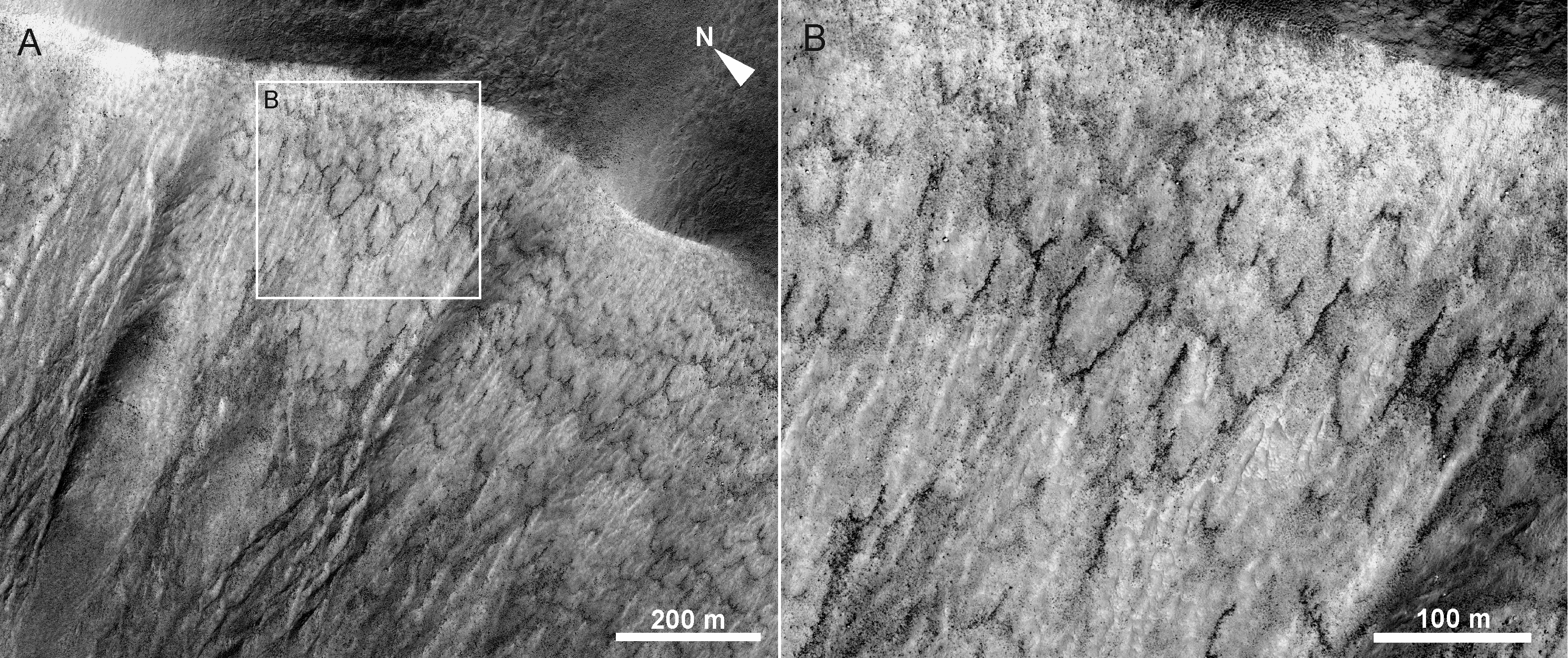
Possible solifluction lobes in Acidalia Planitia on Mars as seen by HiRISE

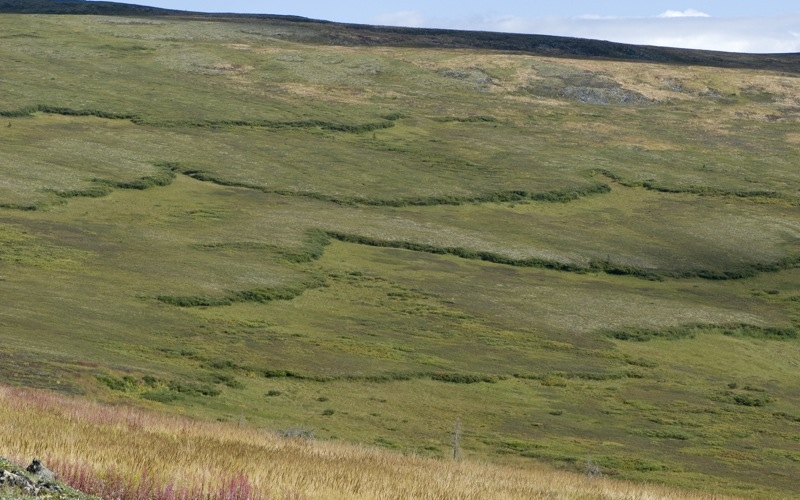
Solifluction sheets near Eagle Summit, Alaska

Solifluction is a collective name for gradual processes in which a mass moves down a slope ("mass wasting") related to freeze-thaw activity. This is the standard modern meaning of solifluction, which differs from the original meaning given to it by Johan Gunnar Andersson in 1906.

== Origin and evolution of the concept ==
In the original sense it meant the movement of waste saturated in water found in periglacial regions. However it was later discovered that various slow waste movements in periglacial regions did not require saturation in water, but were rather associated to freeze-thaw processes. The term solifluction was appropriated to refer to these slow processes, and therefore excludes rapid periglacial movements. In slow periglacial solifluction there are not clear gliding planes, and therefore skinflows and active layer detachments are not included in the concept. On the other hand, movement of waste saturated in water can occur in any humid climate, and therefore this kind of solifluction is not restricted to cold climates.

Slow periglacial solifluction is classified into four types:

- Ice creep
- Frost creep (Note: "Cryogenic deserption" is a transliteration equivalent to frost creep found in some translated Russian scientific literature.)
- Gelifluction
- Plug-like flow

Slow solifluction acts much slower than some geochemical fluxes or than other erosion processes. The relatively low rates at which solifluction operates contrast with its occurrence over wide mountain areas and periglaciated lowlands. Since solifluction is associated with humidity and cold climates it can be used to infer past climates.

== Deposits ==
Deposits of slow periglacial solifluction compromise poorly stratified diamicton and diamicton where stratification is wholly lacking. When stratification can be seen it is often distinguished by a buried organic soil. Some other solifluction deposits that have a more defined stratification consist of alternating layers of diamicton and open-work beds, these last representing buried stone-banked lobes and sheets. A common feature in solifluction deposits is the orientation of clasts parallel to the slope contours.

== Landforms ==
Solifluction lobes and sheets are types of slope failure and landforms. In solifluction lobes sediments form a tongue-shaped feature due to differential downhill flow rates. In contrast, solifluction sheet sediments move more or less uniformly downslope, thus being a less selective form of erosion than solifluction lobes.

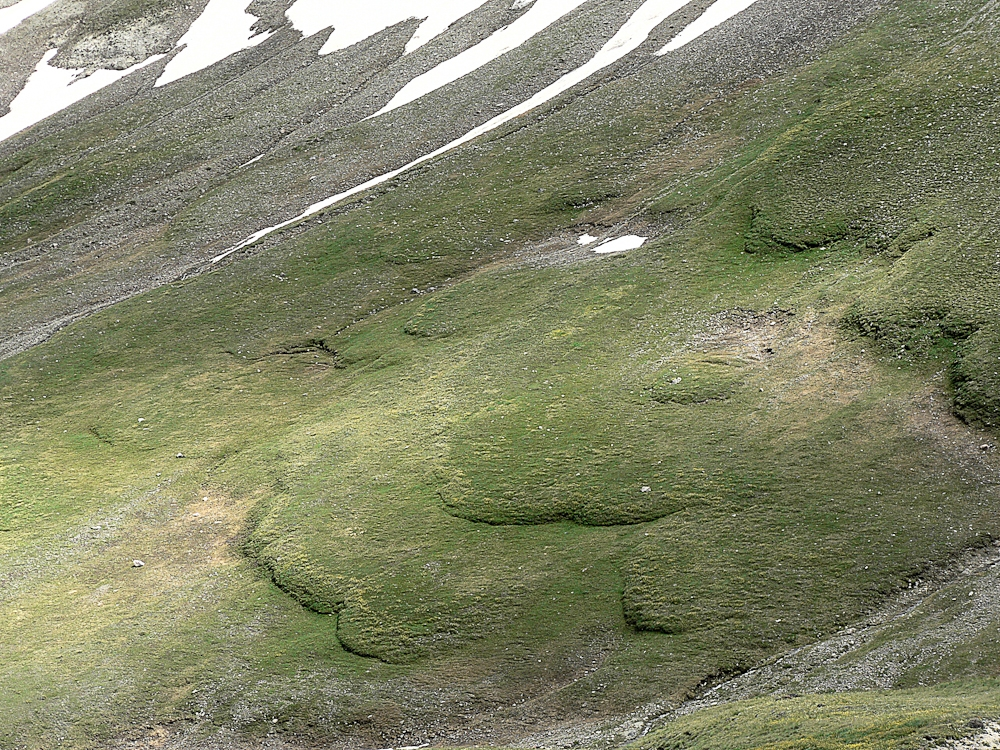
Solifluction lobes in Wyoming

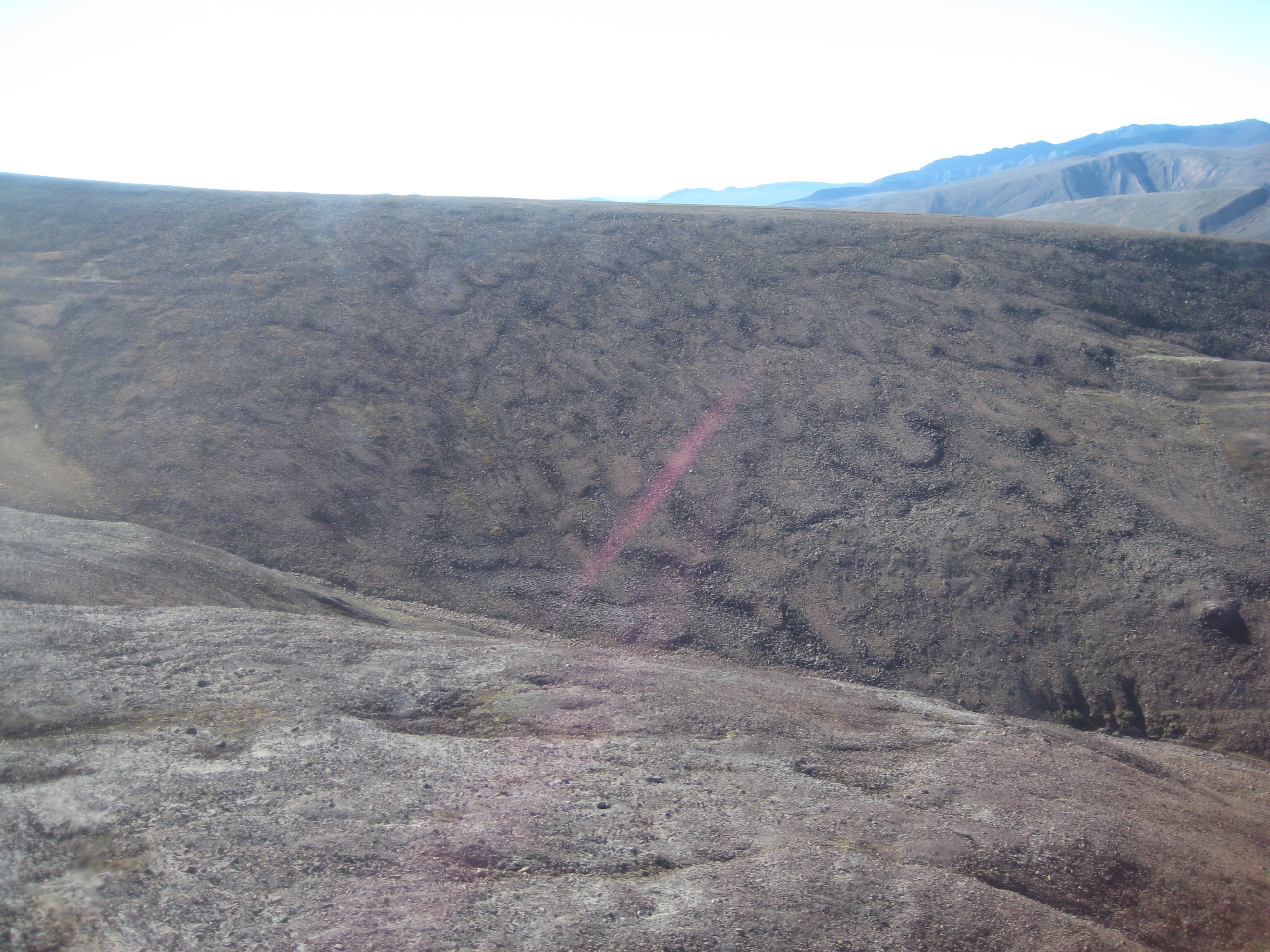
Solifluction lobes on a slope devoid of vegetation - Nunavut, Canada

== Extraterrestrial solifluction ==
It has been suggested that solifluction might be active on Mars, even relatively recently (within the last few million years), as observed Martian lobates bear many similarities with solifluction lobes known from Svalbard.

== See also ==
- Mass wasting
- Stone run – Rock landform made by myriad freeze-thaw cycles
- Frost weathering – Mechanical weathering induced by freezing water
