= Biuletyn Peryglacjalny =

- Discipline: Periglacial geomorphology
- Language: English, French
- Edited by: Jan Dylik (1954–72)

Publication details
- History: 1954—2000
- Publisher: Państwowe Wydawn, Naukowe (Poland)
- Frequency: Annually

Standard abbreviations
- ISO 4: Biul. Peryglac.

Indexing
- CODEN: BIPEAK
- ISSN: 0067-9038
- LCCN: 59028033
- OCLC no.: 915048162

Biuletyn Peryglacjalny was a scientific journal covering research on periglacial geomorphology. It was established in 1954 in Łódź by Polish geomorphologist Jan Dylik, who was its editor-in-chief until 1972. The journal ceased publication after 39 issues in 2000, after having played an important role in the development of periglacial geomorphology.
