= Global and Planetary Change =

- Discipline: Earth sciences
- Language: English
- Edited by: Alan Haywood, Trude Storelvmo, Jed Kaplan, Maoyan Zhu, Zhengtang Guo, Fabienne Marret-Davies, Liviu Matenco, Howard Falcon-Lang

Publication details
- History: 1989-present
- Publisher: Elsevier
- Frequency: Monthly
- Impact factor: 5.114 (2021)

Standard abbreviations
- ISO 4: Glob. Planet. Change

Indexing
- ISSN: 0921-8181
- OCLC no.: 18993035

Links
- Journal homepage; Online access

Global and Planetary Change is a monthly peer-reviewed scientific journal covering research into the earth sciences, particularly pertaining to changes in aspects thereof such as sea level and the chemical composition of the atmosphere. It has been published by Elsevier since it was established in 1989. The editors-in-chief are Alan Haywood, Jed Kaplan, Trude Storelvmo, Liviu Matenco, Zhengtang Guo, Maoyan Zhu, Fabienne Marret-Davies, Howard Falcon-Lang. According to the Journal Citation Reports, the journal has a 2021 impact factor of 5.114.
