= Konstantin Markov =

Soviet geomorphologist and geologist (1905–1980)

- Константин Константинович Марков
- Born: 20 May 1905; Russia
- Died: 18 September 1980 (aged 75); Moscow, Russia
- Education: Leningrad State University
- Known for: Concept of geomorphological levels
- Awards: USSR State Prize, Order of the October Revolution, Order of the Red Banner of Labour, Honored Scientist of the RSFSR
- Scientific career
- Fields: Geomorphologist
- Workplaces: Moscow State University

Konstantin Konstantinovich Markov (Russian: Константин Константинович Марков; 20 May 1905, Vyborg – 18 September 1980, Moscow) was a Soviet geomorphologist and Quaternary geologist. As a geomorphologist Markov theorized on planation surfaces. His geographical research of arid areas outside the Soviet Union led to publications on Morocco, Lake Chad and the Dead Sea. Markov was professor at the Moscow State University.

Markov created the concept of geomorphological levels. In this idealization geomorphic processes on Earth are distributed vertically in the form of concentric spheres, this if there is no tectonic disturbances. The in each sphere a specific kind of process dominates. At sea level abrasion and accretion will dominate landscape, surfaces above this level would be dominated by erosion and peneplanation. Further up mountain tops would form their level.

Cape Markov in Antarctica is named after him.
