= Periglaciation =

Natural processes associated with freezing and thawing in regions close to glaciers

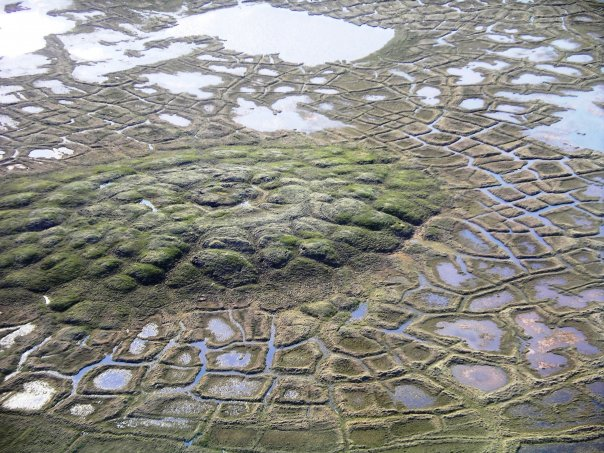
Example of a periglacial landscape with both pingos and polygon wedge ice near Tuktoyaktuk, Northwest Territories, Canada

Periglaciation (adjective: "periglacial", referring to places at the edges of glacial areas) describes geomorphic processes that result from seasonal thawing and freezing, very often in areas of permafrost. The meltwater may refreeze in ice wedges and other structures. "Periglacial" originally suggested an environment located on the margin of past glaciers. However, freeze and thaw cycles influence landscapes also outside areas of past glaciation. Therefore, periglacial environments are anywhere when freezing and thawing modify the landscape in a significant manner.

== History ==
Periglaciation became a distinct subject within the study of geology after Walery Łoziński, a Polish geologist, introduced the term in 1909. Łoziński drew upon the early work of Johan Gunnar Andersson. According to Alfred Jahn, his introduction of his work at the 1910 International Geological Congress held in Stockholm caused significant discussion. In the field trip to Svalbard that followed the congress participants were able to observe the phenomena reported by Łoziński, directly. Łoziński published his contribution to the congress in 1912. From 1950 to 1970, periglacial geomorphology developed chiefly as a subdiscipline of climatic geomorphology that was current in Europe at the time. The journal Biuletyn Peryglacjalny, established in 1954 by Jan Dylik, was important for the consolidation of the discipline.

== Periglacial zones and climates ==
The 'zonal' concept of physical geography has its roots in the work of the German geomorphologist Carl Troll within the general idea of climatic geomorphology. The definition of what a periglacial zone is not clear-cut but a conservative estimate is that a quarter of Earth's land surface has periglacial conditions. Beyond this quarter an additional quarter or fifth of Earth's land surface had periglacial conditions at some time during the Pleistocene. In the northern hemisphere larger swathes of northern Asia and northern North America are periglaciated. In Europe parts of Fennoscandia, Iceland, northern European Russia and Svalbard. In addition Alpine areas in the non-arctic northern hemisphere might also be subject to periglaciation. A major outlier in the northern hemisphere is the Tibetan Plateau that stands out by its size and low-latitude location. In the southern hemisphere parts of the Andes, the ice-free areas of Antarctica and the sub-Antarctic islands are periglaciated. In 1935, Melik discovered that frost weathering had been a very successful geomorphic process in non-glaciated regions of the Slovenian Alps throughout the Pleistocene. The word "periglacial" was not well-known at the time so he merely emphasized enhanced transit of scree down the slopes in relation to mass movement processes. In 1963, Melik introduced the term "periglacial" in the second version of the general section of his Slovenia book, where he also provided a more thorough description of the dominant geomorphic processes on the slopes.

Since Carl Troll introduced the concept of periglacial climate in 1944 there have been various attempts to classify the diversity of periglacial climates. Hugh M. French's classification recognizes six climate types existing in the present:

- High Arctic climates
- Continental climates
- Alpine climates
- Climate of the Tibetan Plateau
- Climates of low annual temperature range
- Climate of dry unglaciated areas of Antarctica

=== Factors affecting location ===
- Latitude – temperatures tend to be higher towards the equator. Periglacial environments tend to be found in higher latitudes. Since there is more land at these latitudes in the north, most of this effect is seen in the northern hemisphere. However, in lower latitudes, the direct effect of the Sun's radiation is greater so the freeze-thaw effect is seen but permafrost is much less widespread.
- Altitude – Air temperature drops by approximately 1 °C for every 100 m rise above sea level. Higher altitudes are associated with more periglacial activity due to colder temperatures, increased freeze-thaw cycles, and greater exposure to wind and snow accumulation. These conditions favor processes like frost heaving, solifluction, and ice wedge formation, which are hallmarks of periglacial environments. (Gruber & Haeberli, 2007)
- Ocean currents – Cold surface currents from polar regions, reduce mean average temperatures in places where they exert their effect so that ice caps and periglacial conditions will show nearer to the Equator as in Labrador for example. Conversely, warm surface currents from tropical seas increases mean temperatures. The cold conditions are then found only in more northerly places. This is apparent in western North America which is affected by the North Pacific current. In the same way but more markedly, the Gulf Stream affects Western Europe.
- Continentality – Away from the moderating influence of the ocean, seasonal temperature variation is more extreme and freeze-thaw goes deeper. In the centres of Canada and Siberia, the permafrost typical of periglaciation goes deeper and extends further towards the Equator. Similarly, solifluction associated with freeze-thaw extends into somewhat lower latitudes than on western coasts.

== Landforms of periglaciation ==
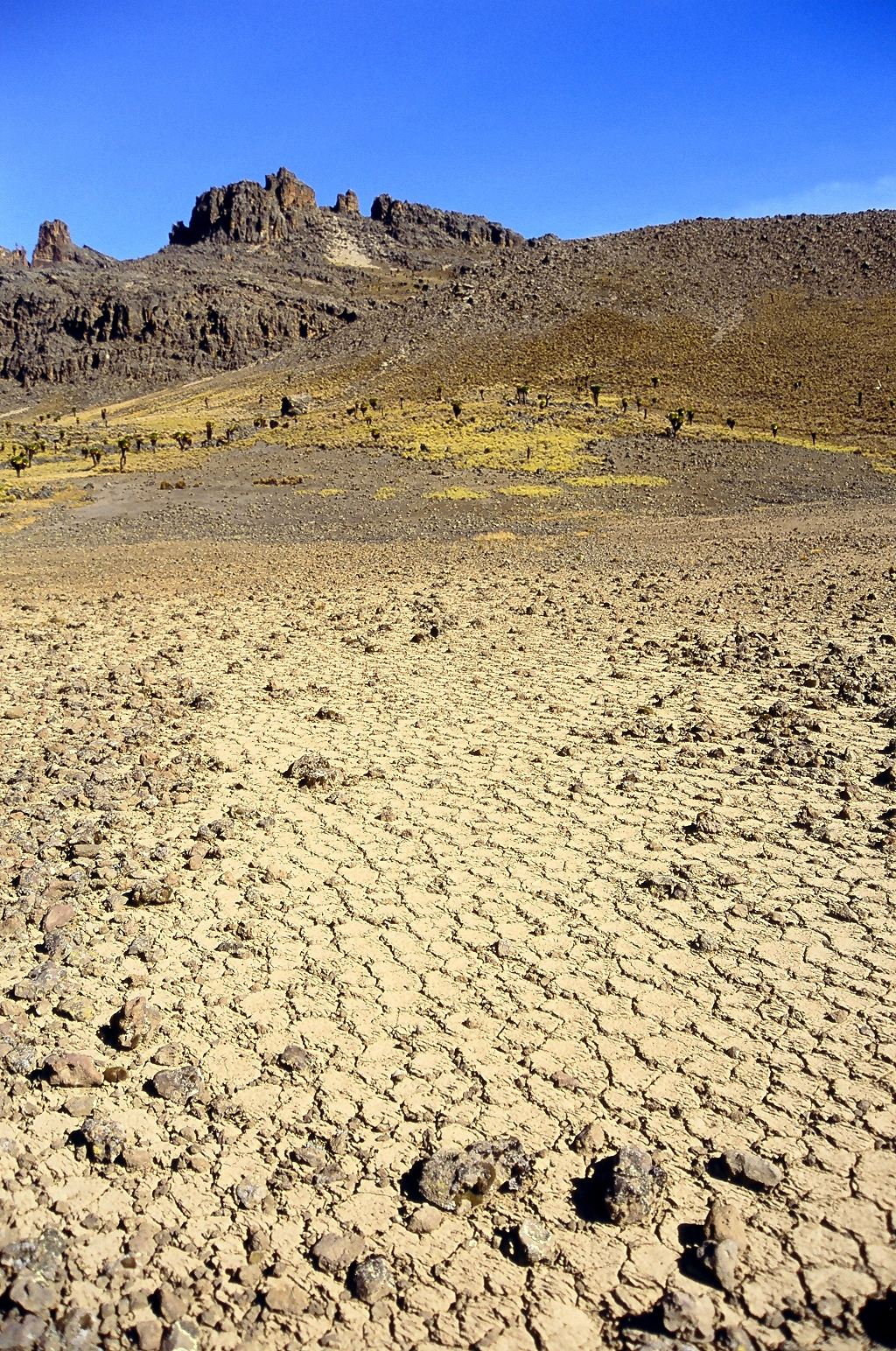
A blockfield around 4000m on Mount Kenya

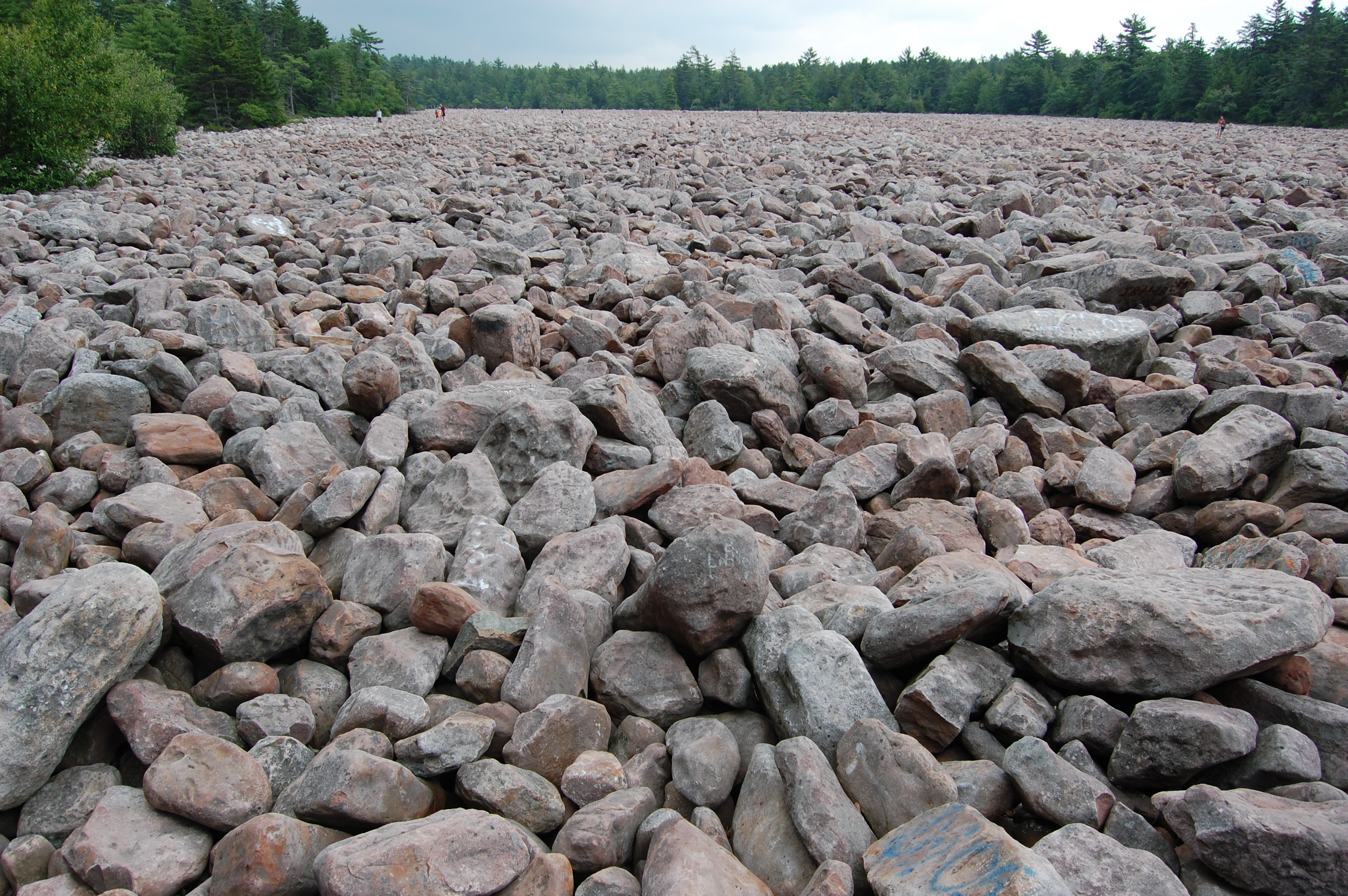
A boulder field in Pennsylvania

Periglaciation results in a variety of ground conditions but especially those involving irregular, mixed deposits created by ice wedges, solifluction, gelifluction, frost creep and rockfalls. Periglacial environments trend towards stable geomorphologies.

- Coombe and head deposits – Coombe deposits are chalk deposits found below chalk escarpments in Southern England. Head deposits are more common below outcrops of granite on Dartmoor.
- Patterned Ground – Patterned ground occurs where stones form circles, polygons and stripes. Local topography affects which of these are expressed. A process called frost heaving is responsible for these features.
- Solifluction lobes – Solifluction lobes are formed when waterlogged soil slips down a slope due to gravity, forming U-shaped lobes.
- Blockfields or Felsenmeer – Blockfields are areas covered by large angular blocks, traditionally believed to have been created by freeze-thaw action. A good example of a blockfield can be found in the Snowdonia National Park, Wales. Blockfields are common in the unglaciated parts of the Appalachian Mountains in the northeastern United States, such as at the River of Rocks or Hickory Run Boulder Field, Lehigh County, Pennsylvania.

Other landforms include:

- Bratschen
- Palsa
- Periglacial lake
- Pingo
- Rock glacier
- Stone stripe
- Thermokarst

== River activity ==
Many areas of periglaciation have relatively low precipitation—otherwise, they would be glaciated—and low evapotranspiration which makes their average river discharge rates low. However, rivers flowing into the Arctic Ocean adjacent to northern Canada and Siberia are prone to erosion resulting from earlier thawing of snow pack in the upper, more southerly reaches of their drainage basins, which leads to flooding downstream, owing to obstructing river ice in the still-frozen, downstream parts of the rivers. When these ice dams melt or break open, the release of impounded water causes erosion.

== Periglacial scientists ==
Notable periglacial scientists include:

- Albert Lincoln Washburn
- André Cailleux
- Jan Dylik
- J. Ross Mackay
- Matti Seppälä
- Carl Troll
