= Diamicton =

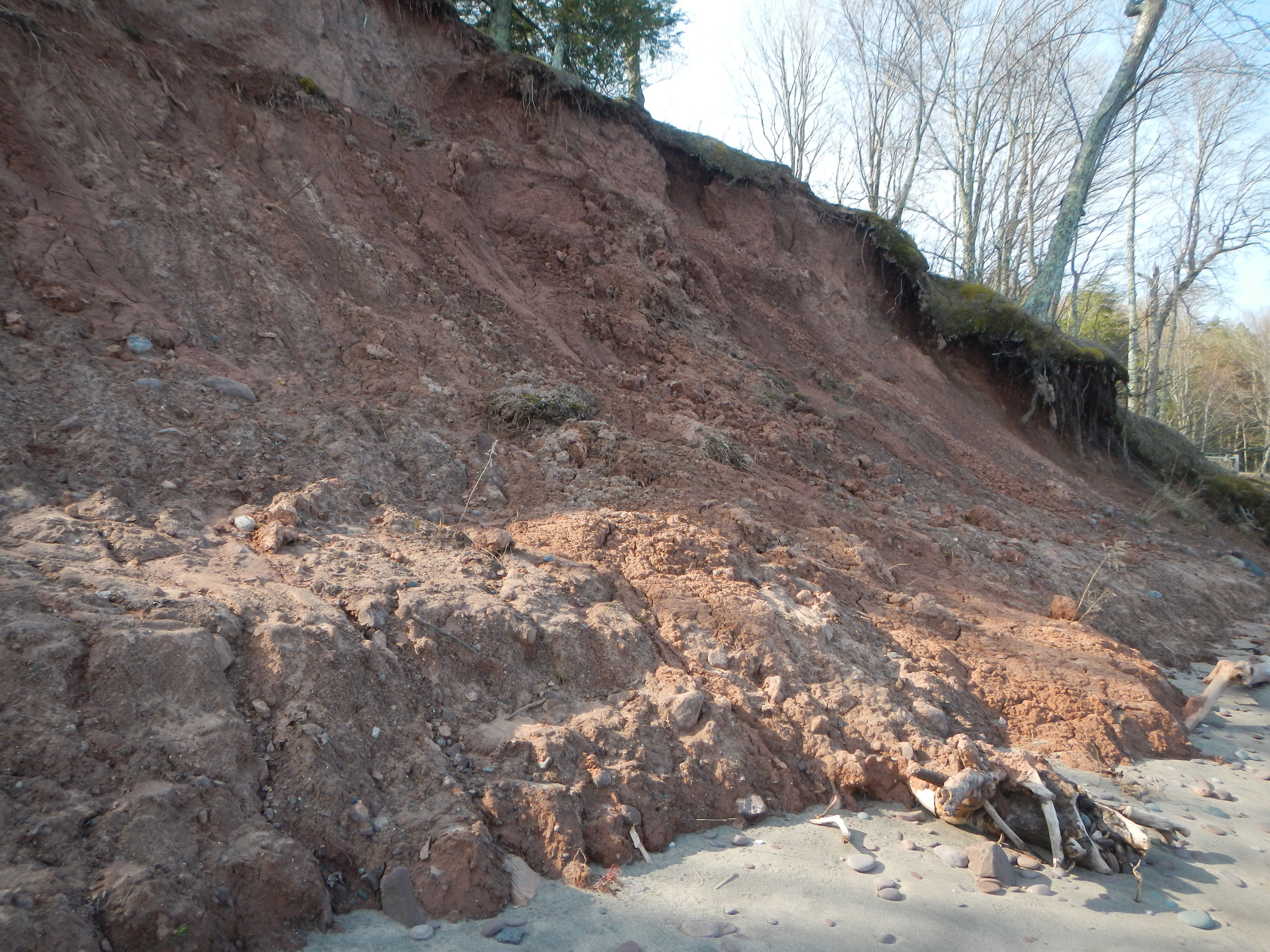
Sandy glacial diamicton (till) bluff on the shore of Lake Superior near Speakers Cabin.

Diamicton (also diamict) (from Greek δια (dia-) 'through' and μικτός (meiktós) 'mixed') is any terrigenous sediment (a sediment resulting from dry-land erosion) that is unsorted to poorly sorted and contains particles ranging in size from clay to boulders, suspended in an unconsolidated matrix of mud or sand. Today, the word has strong connotations to glaciation but can be used in a variety of geological settings.

The term was proposed by Richard Flint and others as a purely descriptive term, devoid of any reference to a specific origin or depositional environment. Although the term is most commonly applied to unsorted glacial deposits (i.e., glacial till), other processes that create diamictons are solifluction, landslides, and debris flows.

The term can generally be applied to types of siliciclastic sediments and sedimentary rocks, and acts as a root name for sediments that are poorly sorted and contain a wide clast size range. Sediments given this root often transverse the boundary of siliciclastic rudaceous, arenaceous and argillaceous sediments. Diamicton is the unconsolidated equivalent of diamictite., otherwise known as lithified diamicton.

The British Geological Survey (BGS), based in the UK, defines diamicton to comprise over 50% pre-existing siliceous rock clasts, but otherwise having undefined composition.

== Types ==
Till is diamicton deposited specifically by the underneath of a glacier and colluvium is diamicton deposited by down slope non-fluvial processes.

Olistostrome differs from diamicton by being derived from submarine (marine or lacustrine) depositional conditions (see turbidities).

== See also ==
- Alluvium - sedimentary deposits that are the results of fluvial transport processes.
- Eluvium - sedimentary deposits that are the results of in situ rock weathering.
- Periglacial Head
