= Morphoclimatic zones =

Areas characterised by landforms associated with a particular climate

In climatic geomorphology, morphoclimatic zones are areas which are characterised by landforms associated with a particular climate. The geomorphological processes involved with distinct climates can have large impacts on the near-surface geology of the area.

However, only some processes and landforms can be associated with particular climates, meaning that they are zonal; processes and landforms not associated with particular climates are labelled azonal. Despite this, azonal processes and landforms might still take on particular characteristics when developing under the influence of particular climates. When identified, morphoclimatic zones do usually lack sharp boundaries and tend to grade from one type to another resulting in that only the core of the zone has all expected attributes. Influential morphoclimatic zoning schemes are those of Julius Büdel (1948, 1963, 1977) and of Jean Tricart and André Cailleux (1965). Büdel's schemes stresses planation and valley-cutting in relation to climate, arguing the valley-cutting is dominant in subpolar regions while planation is so in the tropics. As such this scheme is concerned not only with processes but also with end-products of geomorphic activity. The scheme of Tricart and Cailleux emphasizes the relationship between geomorphology, climate and vegetation. An early attempt at morphoclimatic zoning is that of Albrecht Penck in 1910, who divided Earth in three zones depending on the evaporation-precipitation ratios.

A 1994 review argues that only the concepts of desert, glacial, periglacial and a few coastal (Note: Coral reefs occur only in tropical waters.) morphoclimatic zones are justified. These zones amounts to about half of Earth's land surface, the remaining half cannot be explained in simple terms by climate-landform interactions. The limitations of morphoclimatic zoning were already discussed by Siegfried Passarge in 1926 who considered vegetation and the extent of weathered material as having more direct impact than climate in many parts of the World. According to M.A. Summerfield large-scale zoning of the relief of Earth's surface is better explained on the basis of plate tectonics than on climate. An example of this are the Scandinavian Mountains whose plateau areas and valleys relate to the history of uplift and not to climate.

Piotr Migoń has questioned the validity of certain morphoclimatic zonation schemes since they are named after processes, like planation, that might not occurring at all in large swathes of the zone. Referring to the 1977 scheme of Büdel Migoń states:

Is it really helpful to have the Volcanic Cordillera of Mexico, coastal ranges of southeast Brazil, plains of East Africa, the escarpments of Western Ghats and the mountains of Taiwan in the same zone, labelled as the ‘peritropical zone of excessive planation’?

Morphogenetic zones according to Büdel (1977)
Zone	Latitude	Example
Glacial zone (and immediately adjacent area)	90–65° N 60–90° S	Greenland, Antarctica
Subpolar zone of excessive valley cutting	80–60° N	Canadian Arctic, Taymyr Peninsula
Taiga valley cutting zone, in the permafrost region	70–50° N	Russian Far East
Ectropic zone of retarded valley cutting	60–35° N 35–55° S	Most of Europe, Patagonia, Eurasian Steppe
Subtropic zone of mixed relief development, etesian region	40–30° N 30–35° S	Morocco, Syria, Central Chile.
Subtropic zone of mixed relief development, monsoonal region	45–25° N 20–40° S	Uruguay, Eastern Cape, South Korea
Peritropical zone of excessive planation	30° N–30° S	Venezuela, Angola, Mozambique, Vietnam
Inter-tropical zone of partial planation	20° N–10° S	Panama, Gabon, Sumatra
Warm arid zone of surface preservation and traditionally continued development, largely through fluvio-aeolian sandplains	35–10° N 5–30° S	Atacama, Sahara, Thar, Australian Outback
Winter cold arid zone of surface transformation, largely through pediments and glacis	50–30° N	Gobi, Taklamakan, Maranjab
