= Stratified slope deposit =

Stratified slope deposits or grèzes litées (original French name) are accumulations of debris that are traditionally associated with periglaciation but that can also form in other settings. The deposits have a weak sorting and a coarse bedding. Stratified slope deposits are usually found at the lower slopes of valleys where thicknesses vary but may exceed 10 meters. Periglacial stratified slope deposits are thought to be the result of rock fragmented by frost being accumulated downslope.

A distinction can be made between stratified slope deposits formed in screes and those of grèzes litées type. The first ones form in slopes with angles in excess of 30°, the latter ones in slopes with angles of 30–28° or as low as 5°. The grèzes litées type has been reported from Mediterranean mountains, Atlantic Europe, Central Europe, Himalaya, the Dry Andes and the Tropical Andes. The "biggest known outcrop of grèzes litées in north-western Europe" lies in the Enscherange in Luxembourg. There are relatively few reports of grèzes litées in the High Arctic, nevertheless these include Svalbard, Western Greenland and Southern Banks Island in the Canadian Arctic Archipelago.

== Early concept evolution ==
Stratified slope deposits were first reported under the name of grèzes litées in Charente, France, in 1951. A few years later André Cailleux described similar deposits calling them éboulis ordonnés. Subsequently, Jan Dylik described occurrences in central Poland in the 1960s. In 1968 Jean Tricart argued further for a periglacial origin of grèzes litées. While French scientists gave the term grèzes litées a constrained definition by attributing them to a frost weathering origin and characterizing them granumetrically, its usage by non-French expanded the concept beyond this early definition.

== Processes of formation ==
Periglacial stratified slope deposits form typically in periglacial areas that lack permafrost. Pleistocene-aged stratified slope deposits formed from stone-banked solifluction lobes. In the Andes the depth of freezing associated with the formation of stratified slope deposit is estimated at less than 15 cm while in Charente it is 40 to 50 cm.

A major process that forms stratified slope deposits in periglacial areas is solifluction of stone blankets in the form of solifluction lobes and sheets. Other processes include rock fall, flow of ice-coasted clasts, flow of dry grains, debris flow and snow avalanches. Yet more processes contribute to the formation, but that are of lesser importance, include overland flow of water caused by rain and the combined action of snow and wind.

Stratified slope deposits can form in non-periglacial environments, meaning that the presence of stratified slope deposit is not unequivocal evidence for past periglaciation. The reason for the occurrence of stratified slope deposits outside present or past periglacial areas is that many of the processes that lead to their formation are azonal.
