= Inland dune =

Sand dunes found outside of coastal areas

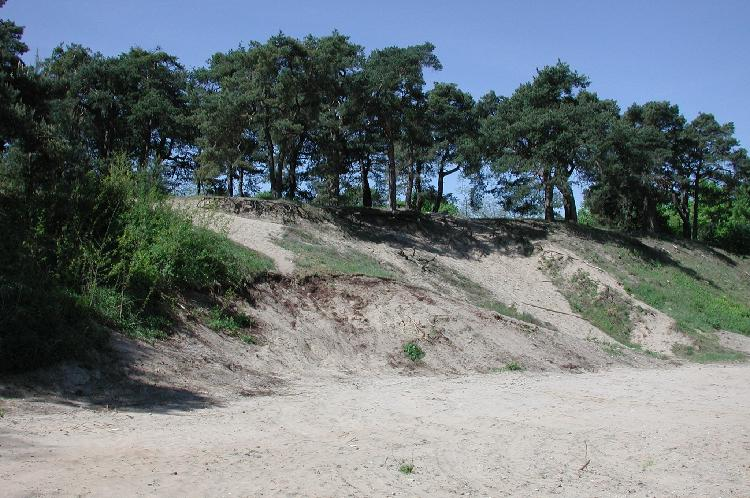
Sandhausen inland dunes on the Upper Rhine Plain

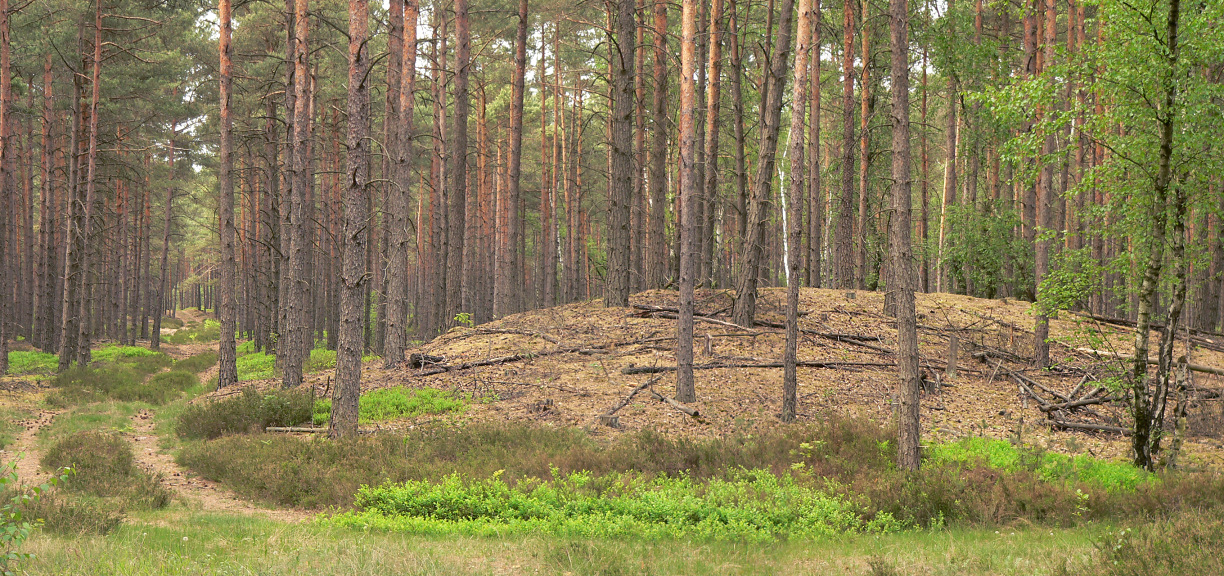
Inland dunes beneath pine forest in the Urstromtal of the Aller near Winsen (Aller)

Inland dunes are eolian sand dunes that are found inland, away from coastal regions.

== Formation ==
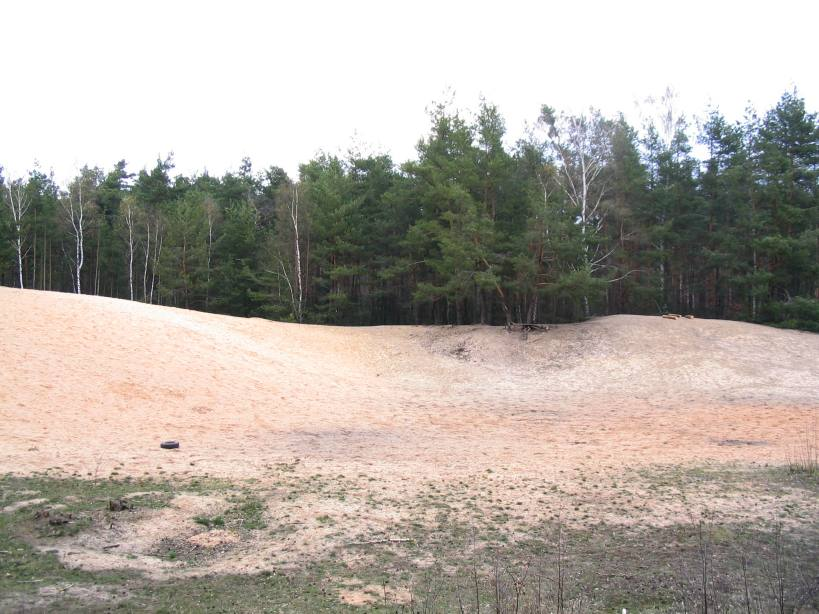
Inland dunes on the Franconian "Sand Axis" north of Nuremberg

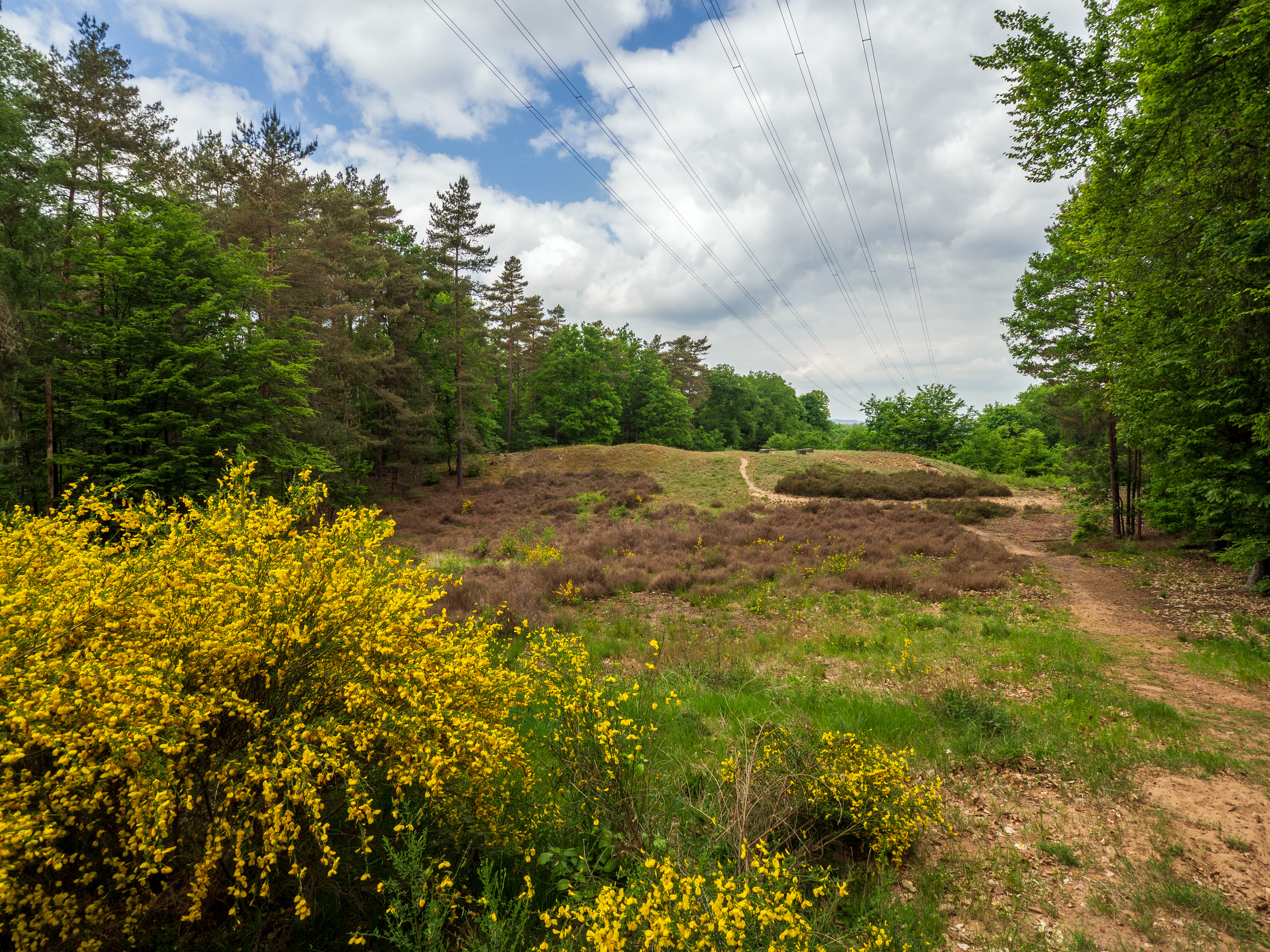
Inland dunes at the cemetery in Homburg

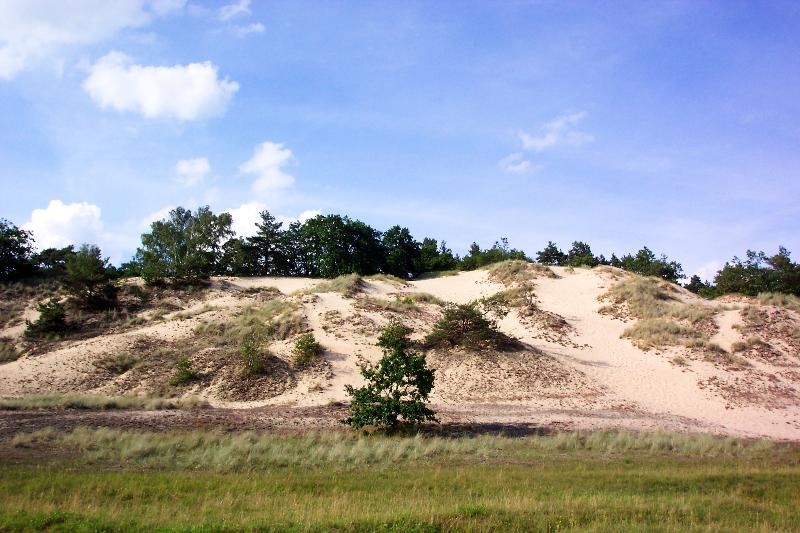
Inland dunes on the Elbe near Dömitz (Klein Schmölen Nature Reserve) near Dömitz 53.12576°N 11.29120°E

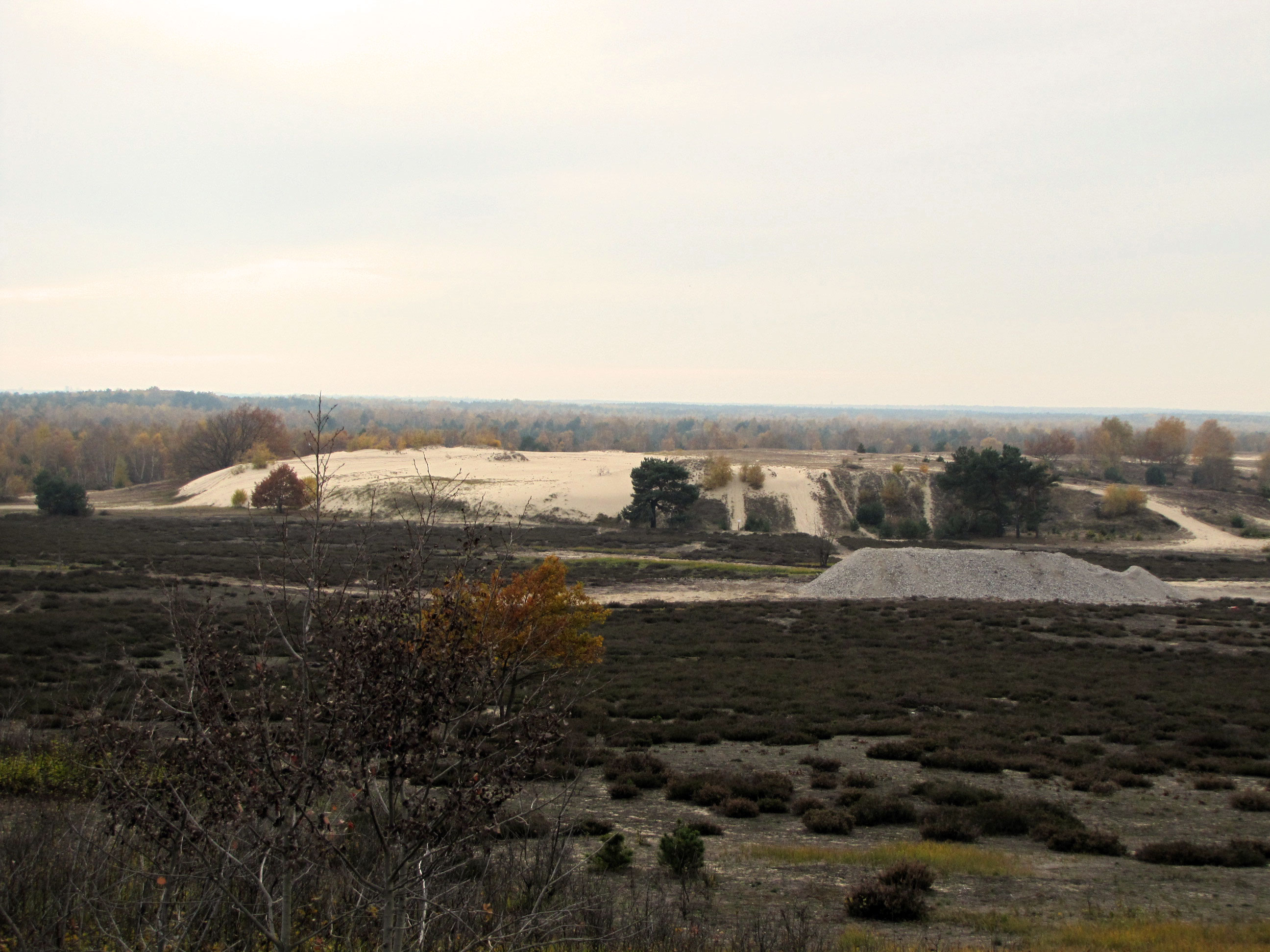
Wandering dunes in the Nuthe-Nieplitz Nature Park

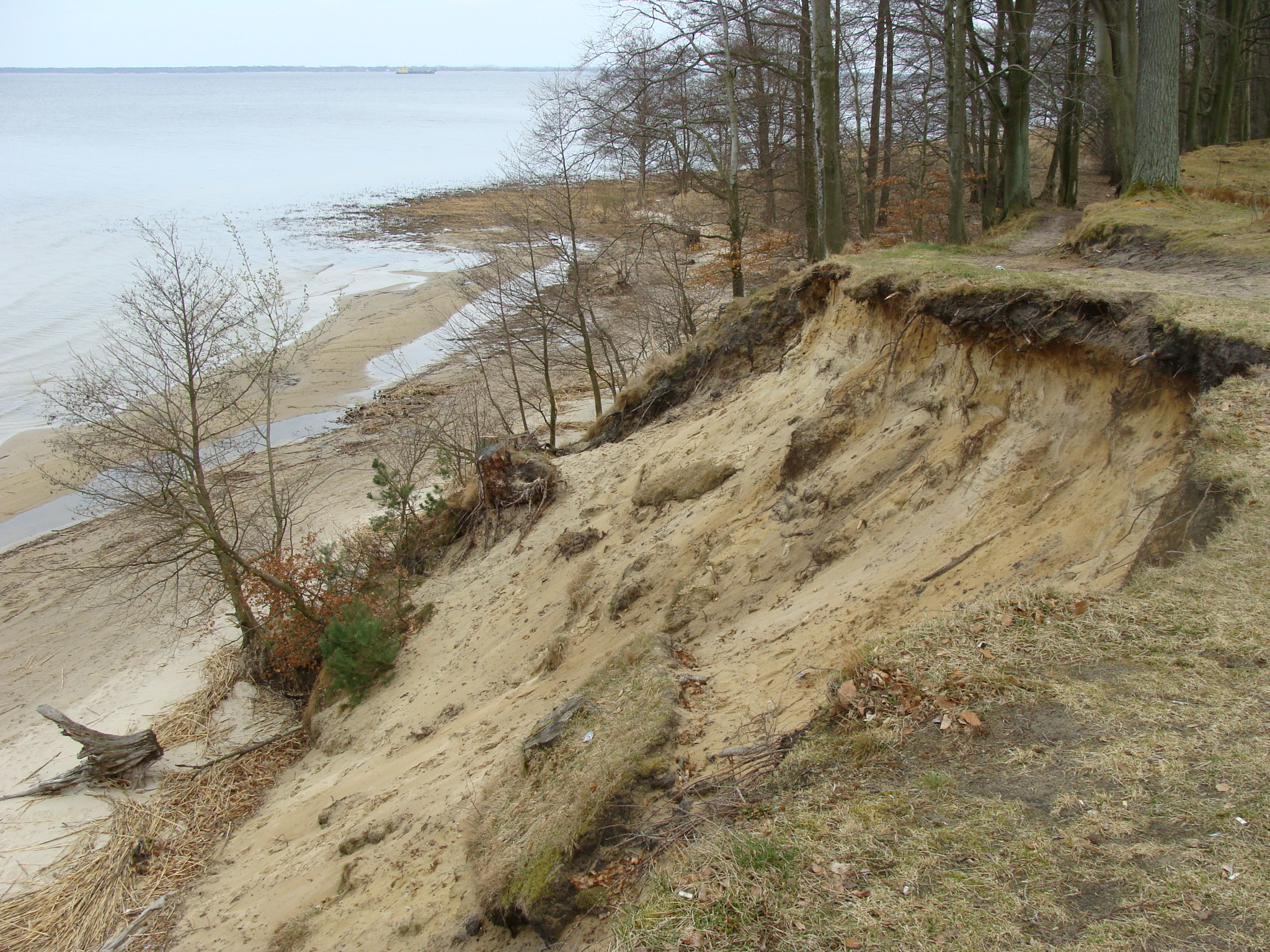
Inland dune and southern shore of Szczecin Lagoon in Ueckermünde Heath between Brzózki and Trzebież, Police County, Poland

In Central Europe, towards the end of the last glacial period (about 12,000 years ago), it was about 10 degrees colder than today. There was therefore no forest cover but only patchy vegetation in the form of tundra. In addition, in the areas covered by the ice sheet, the vegetation had to re-establish itself as the glaciers melted. As a result, the winds could blow almost unhindered. Light, fine-grained soil particles, especially of silt and sand were plucked up by air currents, often transported for miles and then deposited at another location. The wind also had a sorting effect - silt is transported significantly faster than sand - and this resulted, over time, in areas of aeolian sand and sand dunes being formed, while the silt was transported much further and redeposited, for example, on the northern edge of highlands.

In high winds the dunes had a tendency to "wander". Most of the currently existing inland dunes were created at this time. With the end of the glacial period, the mobility of the dunes quickly came to a halt as a result of reforestation.

The shape of inland dunes varies depending on the prevailing wind direction and strength. Most of them are rather irregular dunes or shifting belts of sand. But there are also occur very well-formed parabolic dunes and longitudinal dunes.

Nearly all recent phases of the development of inland dunes are affected by human intervention on the vegetation cover. By the deliberate or unintentional clearing of the forest, dunes became mobile again in areas where they had become static.

The analysis of charcoal particles in the dunes using radiocarbon dating has established that the activity of settlers in the Neolithic period caused the dunes to become mobile again. But even in the Bronze and Iron Age there is evidence of man-induced dune activity.

== Distribution ==
=== North America ===
Many inland eolian dunes are present in North America, including vegetated (stabilized) eolian dunes of the U.S. Atlantic Coastal Plain, dunes of Laurentian Great Lakes region, dunes of the Central and Southern Great Plains, the Nebraska Sand Hills, White Sands (New Mexico), Great Sand Dunes (Colorado), dunes of the southern Colorado Plateau, and dune fields of the Southwest Deserts.

Baja California

The sands of the inland dunes of El Vizcaíno Desert, Baja California, Mexico, come from nearby alluvial sources. Originally the sands are thought to have derived from granitoids, schists as well as sedimentary and volcanic rocks. While composition suggest that dune sands come from a craton setting geochemistry indicates an active continental margin setting for the origin of the sand.

=== South America ===
Argentine Pampas

Large fossil dune fields or paleo-dune field exist in La Pampa Province of Argentina. These dune are vestiges of past climatic conditions that allowed for movement of sand. The dunes are not active any longer as result of the stabilizing effect of grasses. However the dunes have been degraded by cattle grassing and agriculture. A particular dune field covers the floor of a 40 km-long and 5 km broad NE-SW valley. It is made up of very large parabolic dunes with lesser blowout dunes built on top.

Atacama Desert

Near Copiapó in the southern reaches of the Atacama Desert the largest dunes of Chile exists. Based on an analysis of sediments it has been suggested that the dunes derive from fluvial sediments. A previous explanation suggests that the dunes originated from coastal sand in marine terraces that were uplifted, then deflation would have caused this sand to migrate inland. At present the dunes are active but starved of sediment supply.

Gran Chaco

Inland dunes in the Gran Chaco of Bolivia and Paraguay are concentrated at the Andean foothills. Most of these dunes are inactive with some being as old as 33–36 thousand years old.

=== Europe ===
Central Europe

Within Central Europe, therefore, inland dunes exclude the belts of coastal dunes on the North Sea and Baltic Sea coasts. Unlike their coastal cousins, inland dunes are aeolian formations of sand (dunes) transported and then deposited by wind. They were predominantly created under cold climatic, periglacial conditions at the end of the Weichselian and Würm ice ages, i.e. roughly more than 10,000 years ago. Their development during the post-glacial period has been heavily influenced by mankind.

Best example of such continental sandfields is Deliblato Sands which is sometimes called the “Sahara of Europe”. It is mainly afforested today, and open sand surface is rare, although the sand is still moving (gradual aeolian blasting).

Northern Fennoscandia

In northern Sweden numerous inactive dunes exists. These dunes were formed in a Holocene periglacial context when the Weichsel Ice Sheet was retreating. At present smaller parabolic dunes are forming in northern Sweden due to redeposition of deflated dunes. As recorded by dune stratification the wind the formed the larger and older dunes blew from northwestern directions.

Inland dunes can also be found in Finnish Lapland north of the Arctic Circle and in Norway's Finnmark.

== Literature ==
- Alisch, M. (1995): Das äolische Relief der mittleren Oberen Allerniederung (Ostniedersachsen) - spät- und postglaziale Morphogenese, Ausdehnung und Festlegung historischer Wehsande, Sandabgrabungen und Schutzaspekte. - 176 pp.; Cologne. - [Kölner Geographische Arbeiten, H. 62]
- Alisch, M. (1994a): Kritische Abwägung natürlicher Prozeßkomponenten im Ursachenkomplex der holozänen Flugsandreaktivierung des mitteleuropäischen Binnenlandes. - In: 1. Mitteleuropäische Geomorphologentagung Wien 1994, 19.-21. July 1994 [Tagungsband]: pp. 91–92; Vienna.
- Alisch, M., & Brunotte, E. (1992): Aktuelle äolische Morphodynamik der Binnendünen und Flugsandebenen in der Allerniederung bei Gifhorn. - In: GRUNERT, J., & Höllermann, P. [ed.]: Geomorphologie und Landschaftsökologie. Eine Zusammenstellung von Beiträgen anläßlich der 17. Tag. des dt. Arb.-Kreises für Geomorphologie in Bonn 1991: pp. 186Ó195; Bonn. - [Bonner geogr. Abh., 85]
- Bettag, E. (1989): Fauna der Sanddünen zwischen Speyer und Dudenhofen. - Pollichia Buch 17: 148 pp.; Bad Dürkheim.
- Philippi, G. (1973): Sandfluren und Brachen kalkarmer Flugsande des mittleren Oberrheingebietes. Veröff. Landesst. Naturschutz und Landschaftspflege Bad.-Württ. 41: 24–62.
- Pyritz, E. (1972): Binnendünen und Flugsandebenen im Niedersächsischen Tiefland. - Göttinger Geogr. Abh., 61: 153 pp.; Göttingen.
- Pyritz, E. (1974): Äolische Prozesse an einer Binnendüne im Allertal. - Abh. Akad. Wiss. Göttingen, math.-phys. Kl., 3rd series, 29: pp. 219–225; Göttingen.
- Volk, 0. H. (1931): Beiträge zur Ökologie der Sandvegetation der Oberrheinischen Tiefebene. Zeitschr. f. Botanik 24: 81–185, Jena.
