= Budel (disambiguation) =

Budel may refer to:

- Budel, village in the Dutch province of North Brabant
- Budel, Poland, village in the Masovian Voivodeship in east-central Poland
- Alessandro Budel, Italian footballer
- Julius Büdel (1903–1983), German geomorphologist
- Büdel Islands, at Antarctica
- Kempen Airport, also known as Budel Airport
