= Grevillea hystrix =

Conservation status
- Priority One — Poorly Known Taxa (DEC)

Scientific classification
- Kingdom: Plantae
- Clade: Embryophytes
- Clade: Tracheophytes
- Clade: Angiosperms
- Clade: Eudicots
- Order: Proteales
- Family: Proteaceae
- Genus: Grevillea
- Species: G. hystrix

Binomial name
- Grevillea hystrix R.W.Davis

Species of plant endemic to Australia

Grevillea hystrix, also known as porcupine grevillea, is a species of plant in the Proteaceae family and is endemic to Western Australia.

== Description ==
The species grows as a low, prickly shrub to 40–60 cm (16–24 in) in height by 30–100 cm (12–39 in) across. The sharply pointed leaves are 5–8 mm long by 0.8–1 mm wide. The conflorescent flowers are predominantly red, appearing from late August to early October.

== Taxonomy ==
Grevillea hystrix was first formally described in 2020 by Robert Wayne Davis in the journal Nuytsia from specimens collected by Juliet Wege and Kelly Anne Shepherd near Koolyanobbing in 2017. The specific epithet (hystrix) means 'porcupine', with reference to the spiny leaves.

== Distribution and habitat ==
The species is known only from a single population of about 20 plants, east of the mining town of Koolyanobbing, in the Coolgardie bioregion of Southwest Australia. It occurs in sandplain country in low open shrubland on yellow clayey-sandy soils. Despite extensive surveys in the area, the species has not been recorded elsewhere.

== Conservation status ==
Grevillea hystrix is listed as priority one by the Western Australian Government Department of Biodiversity, Conservation and Attractions, meaning it is known from only a few populations which are under immediate threat from known threatening processes.

The species is known only from a single population consisting of approximately 20 plants, many of which appear to be senescing or dying. Some of these plants appear to have new shoots growing from older stems.
