= Gallery forest =

Type of riparian forest in dry regions

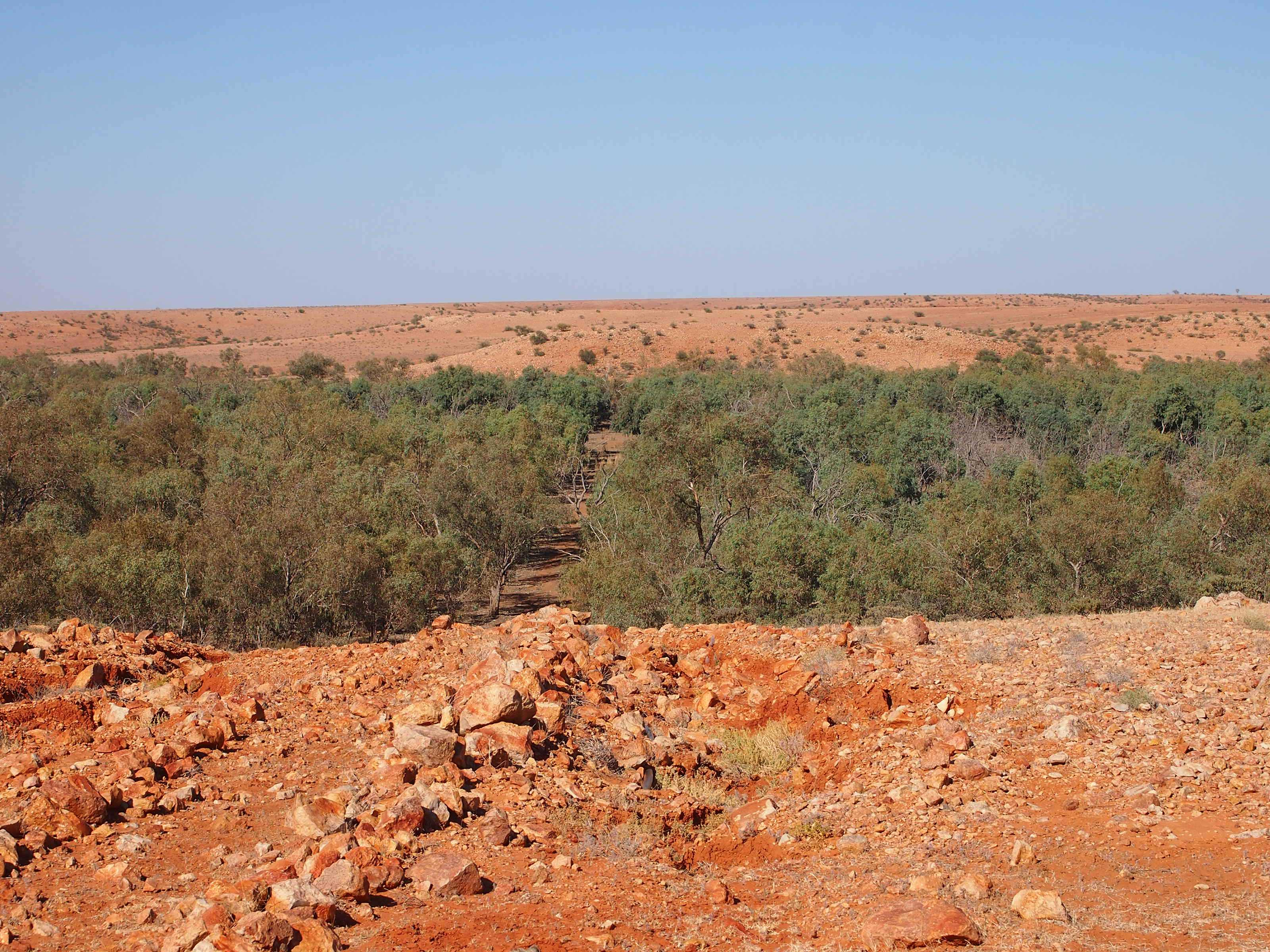
Gallery forest of the Finke River, Australia

A gallery forest is one formed as a corridor along rivers or wetlands, projecting into landscapes that are otherwise only sparsely treed such as savannas, grasslands, or deserts. The gallery forest maintains a more temperate microclimate above the river. Defined as long and narrow forest vegetation associated with rivers, gallery forests are structurally and floristically heterogeneous.

The habitats of these forests differ from the surrounding landscapes because they are, for example, more nutrient-rich or moister, and there is less chance of fires. The forests are sometimes only a few meters wide, because they depend on the water they lie along.

== Ecology characteristics ==
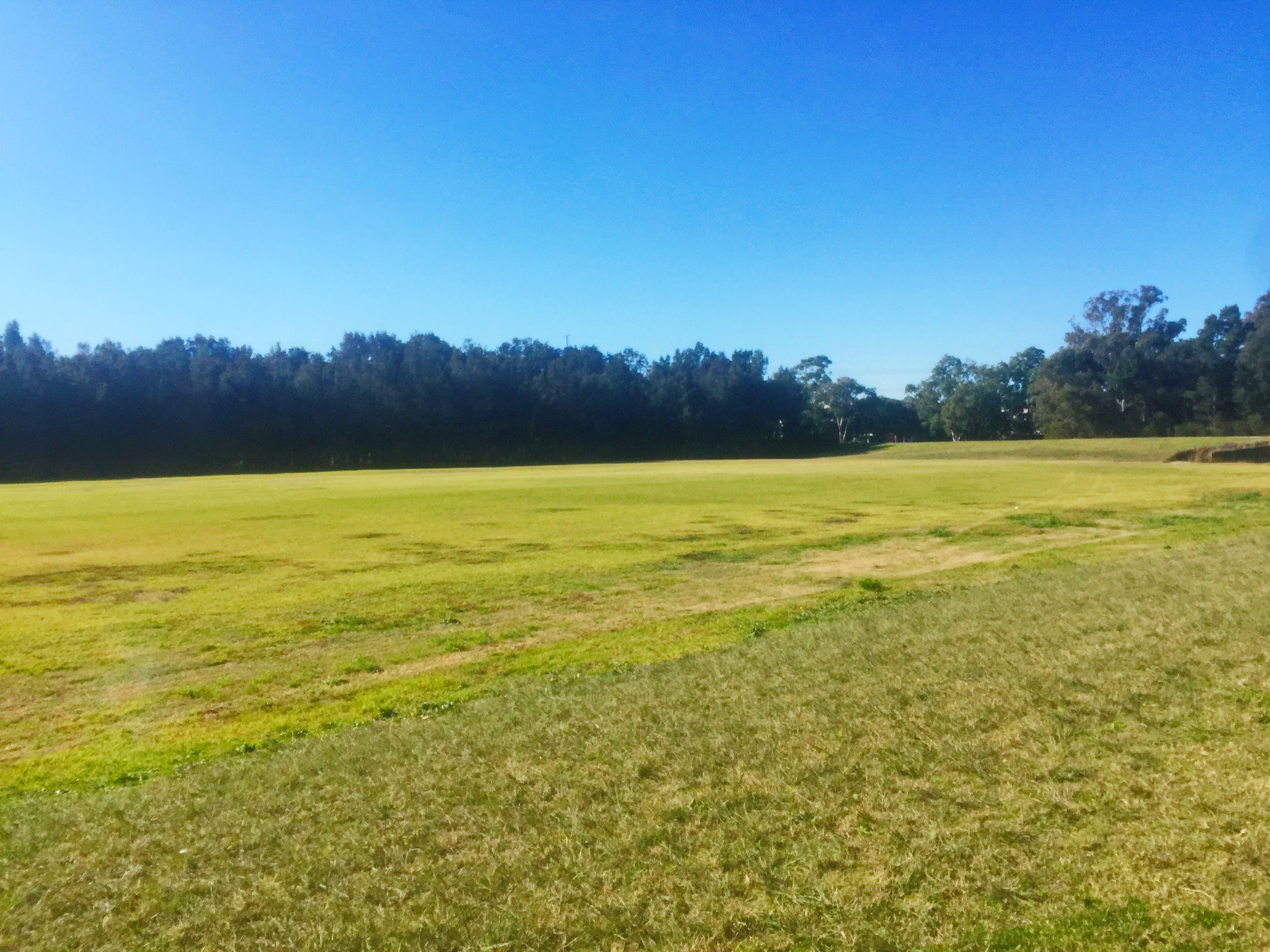
A gallery forest composed of she-oaks, along Prospect Creek in Western Sydney.

The riparian zones in which they grow offer greater protection from fire which would kill tree seedlings. In addition, the alluvial soils of the gallery habitat are often of higher fertility and have better drainage than the soils of the surrounding landscape with a more reliable water supply at depth. As a result, the boundary between gallery forest and the surrounding woodland or grassland is usually abrupt, with the ecotone being only a few metres wide.

Gallery forests have shrunk in extent worldwide as a result of human activities, including domestic livestock's preventing tree seedling establishment and the construction of dams and weirs causing flooding or interfering with natural stream flow. In addition to these disturbances, gallery forests are also threatened by many of the same processes that threaten savannas. Riparian zones offer protection from fire and stress from water shortages.

The name "gallery" comes from an older sense of that word meaning a narrow passageway; compare with "mine gallery". They are clearly identified in the landscape by sticking to the course of the river, forming a corridor completely different from the rest of the vegetation, in color and height.

== Areas ==
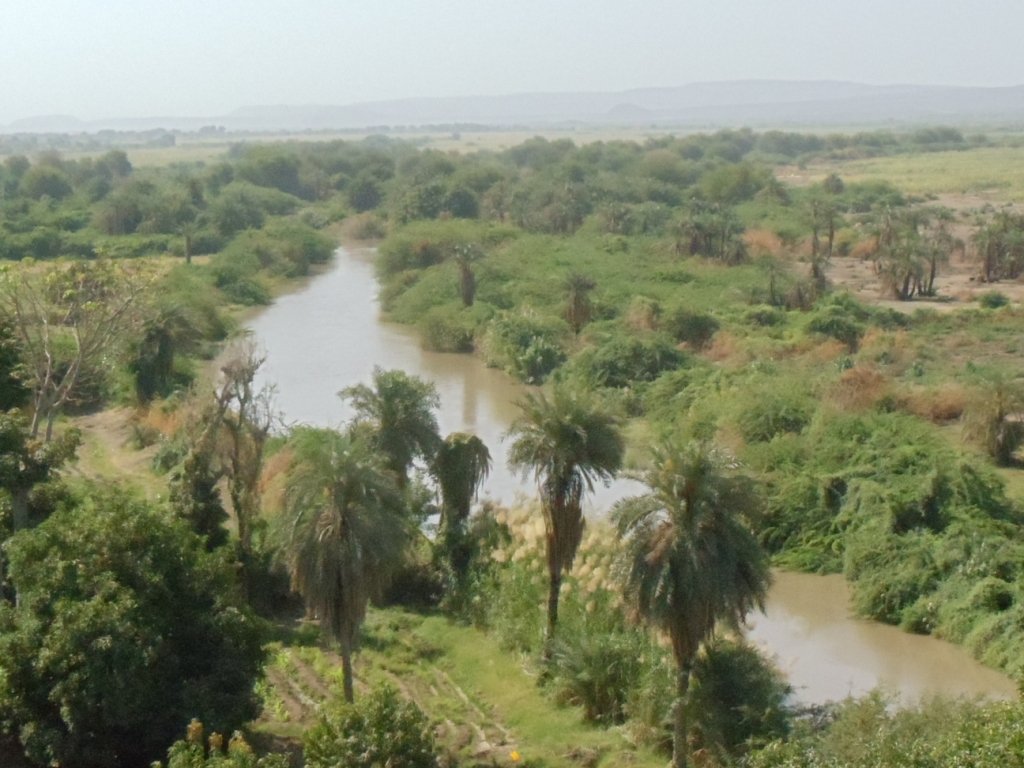
Gallery forest along the Awash River in the Afar region of Ethiopia

Gallery forests are able to exist where the surrounding landscape does not support forests for a number of reasons. Gallery forests are often found along so-called "foreign rivers" in arid areas where no other forest grows due to the lack of water (river-accompanying gallery forest). The gallery forest is an azonal form of vegetation here, it only thrives there because of the special local conditions. Gallery forest can also form due to more favorable soil conditions on the river bank. Examples of this are the plains of the Llanos in Venezuela, where grasses predominate despite high rainfall and only the embankments are wooded. On the plains, a hard laterite crust in the soil, the arrecife, which is hardly penetrable for roots, prevents the growth of trees. The exceptional nature of some of these forests makes them the object of special protection, such as those on the banks of the Tagus River in Aranjuez, which have been classified as World Heritage Sites.

Gallery forests also exist along the valleys of Omaruru, Swakop and Kuiseb in the Central Namibia. Here the riverbeds are filled with a thick layer of sand, through which groundwater flows even when there is no rain. Gallery forest in cultivated land can be found on waterbodies in pasture and farmland (e.g. alluvial forest) as well as on terrain levels (hillside forests in Europe), i.e. plots of land that are not suitable for farming. It is often the small forest as a private economic wood reserve, or unusable or inaccessible fallow land as a natural forest residue. Gallery forests have persisted in North America in prairie-dominated areas along rivers and streams. In dry to temperate zones, the presence of water is not the only factor that determines species. Grassland fires, even where they are rare, have had a high selective pressure value against woody vegetation.

Early hominin species such as Ardipithecus ramidus, Australopithecus anamensis and Homo rudolfensis have inhabited gallery forests.

== See also ==
- Bosque
- Coastal swamp oak forest
- Forest-savanna mosaic
- Oasis
- Riparian forest
- Riparian zone restoration
- Tugay
