= Büdel Islands =

The Büdel Islands (65°47′S 65°38′W) are a group of islands lying between Laktionov Island and Schule Island, off the east side of Renaud Island in the Biscoe Islands. First accurately shown on an Argentine government chart of 1957, they were named by the UK Antarctic Place-Names Committee in 1959 for Julius Büdel, German sea ice specialist.

== See also ==
- List of Antarctic and sub-Antarctic islands
