= Julius Büdel =

German geomorphologist

- Born: 8 August 1903; Molsheim, Alsace-Lorraine, German Empire (present-day Grand Est, France)
- Died: 28 August 1983 (aged 80); Würzburg, West Germany (present-day Germany)
- Citizenship: Germany, West Germany
- Education: University of Vienna
- Known for: Morphogenetic zones Relief generations
- Awards: Albrecht-Penck-Medaille (1968); Victoria Medal (1981)
- Scientific career
- Fields: Climatic geomorphology
- Workplaces: University of Würzburg

Julius Büdel (8 August 1903 – 28 August 1983) was a German geomorphologist noted for his work on the influence of climate in shaping landscapes and landforms. In his work Büdel stressed the importance of inherited landforms in present-day landscapes and argued that many landforms are the result of a combination of processes, and not of a single process. Büdel estimated that 95% of mid-latitude landforms are relict. Büdel studied both cold-climate processes in Svalbard and "tropical" weathering processes in India to understand the origin of the relief of Central Europe, which he argued was a palimpsest of landforms formed at different times and under different climates. For Central Europe Büdel concluded that in Late Cretaceous to Early Pliocene times etchplains formed. Then in Late Pliocene to Early Pleistocene times a transition period occurred in landscape forming processes. Finally in the Late Pleistocene periglaciation and deep permafrost made Central Europe a place of "excessive valley cutting". Holocene developments would not have affected much of the landscape other than adding a deep soil cover.

Through his life Büdel published three influential morphoclimatic zoning schemes. The first, in 1948, was followed by another in 1963, and a final version in 1977. Büdel's schemes emphasise planation and valley-cutting in relation to climate, arguing that valley-cutting is dominant in subpolar regions while planation is so in the tropics.

Much of Büdel's 1977 book Klima-geomorphologie was considered outdated as of 2006. However its pioneering approaches make it a classic in geomorphological literature.

The Büdel Islands in Antarctica were named after him.

Morphogenetic zones according to Büdel (1977)
German name	English translation	Latitude	Example
	Glacial zone (and immediately adjacent area)	90–65° N 60–90° S	Greenland, Antarctica
Die subpolare Zone exzessiver Talbildung	Subpolar zone of excessive valley cutting	80–60° N	Canadian Arctic, Taymyr Peninsula
	Taiga valley cutting zone, in the permafrost region	70–50° N	Russian Far East
Ektropische Zone retardierter Talbildung	Ectropic zone of retarded valley cutting	60–35° N 35–55° S	Most of Europe, Patagonia, Eurasian Steppe
	Subtropic zone of mixed relief development, etesian region	40–30° N 30–35° S	Morocco, Syria, Central Chile.
	Subtropic zone of mixed relief development, monsoonal region	45–25° N 20–40° S	Uruguay, Eastern Cape, South Korea
Die randtropische Zone exzessiver Flächenbildung	Peritropical zone of excessive planation	30° N–30° S	Venezuela, Angola, Mozambique, Vietnam
Die innertropische Zone partieller Flächenbildung	Inter-tropical zone of partial planation	20° N–10° S	Panama, Gabon, Sumatra
Warme Trockenzone der Flächenerhaltung und traditionalen Weiterbildung (vorweg durch Sandschwemmebenen)	Warm arid zone of surface preservation and traditionally continued development, largely through fluvio-aeolian sandplains	35–10° N 5–30° S	Atacama, Sahara, Thar, Australian Outback
Winterharte Trockenzone der Flächenüberprägung (Transformation) vorweg durch Pedimenteund Glacis	Winter cold arid zone of surface transformation, largely through pediments and glacis	50–30° N	Gobi, Taklamakan, Maranjab

== See also ==
- André Cailleux
- Jan Dylik
- Jean Tricart
