= Schule Island =

Schule Island (65°46′S 65°33′W) is a small island lying 4 nautical miles (7 km) east of Laktionov Island, off the east side of Renaud Island in the Biscoe Islands. First accurately shown on an Argentine government chart of 1957. Named by the United Kingdom Antarctic Place-Names Committee (UK-APC) in 1959 for John J. Schule, Jr., American oceanographer who organized the sea ice service of the U.S. Hydrographic Office in 1950.

== See also ==
- List of Antarctic and sub-Antarctic islands
