= Lech dl Dragon =

Lake in Italy

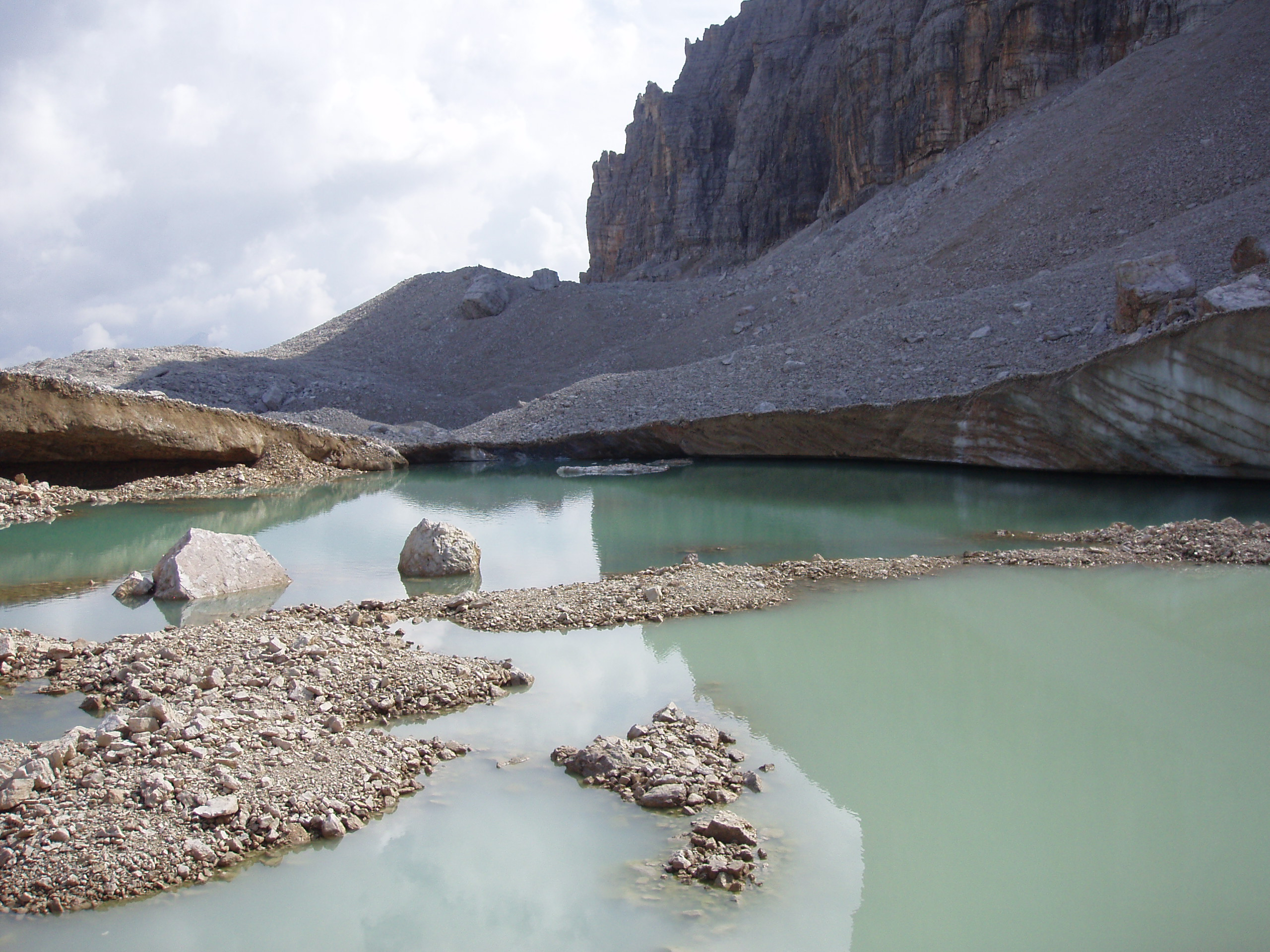
- Lake in 2005

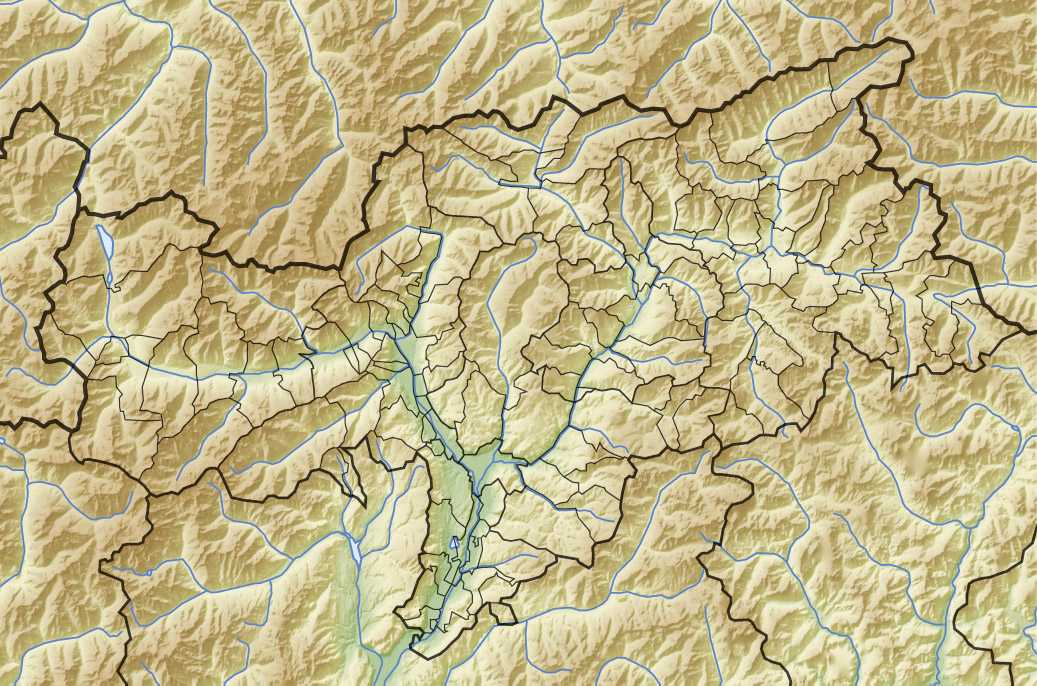
- Location within South Tyrol
- Location: Bolzano, Trentino-Alto Adige, Italy
- Coordinates: 46°32′05″N 11°48′18″E
- Lake type: proglacial
- Basin countries: Italy
- Surface area: variable
- Surface elevation: 2,680 m (8,790 ft)

Lech dl Dragon (Drachensee in German) is a proglacial lake in the Dolomites of South Tyrol, Italy. The lake is located on a ledge on the north side of the Sella Group. It is created periodically from the melting of a glacier that is hidden beneath the scree from the rock towers, above.

The lake disappeared in the 1970s, reappeared in 2002, then disappeared in 2007. As of 2011, the lake contains water.

The lake is named from a legend of the inhabitants of Val Gardena. The legend describes the screams of a dragon living in the area.

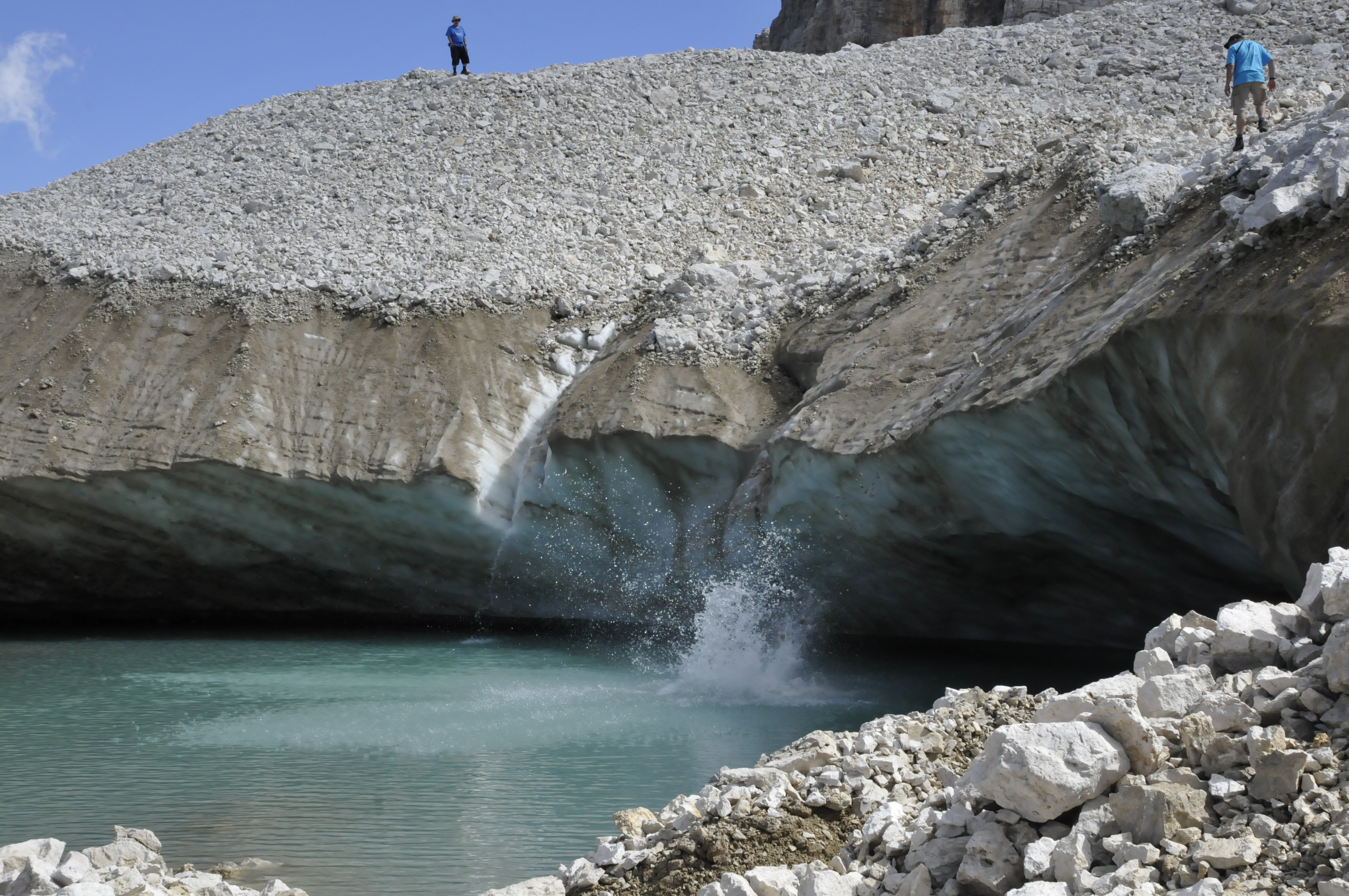
The scree-covered glacier as of 2011
