= Relict (geology) =

Rock that survived a destructive geologic process

A relict, in geology, is a structure or mineral from a parent rock that did not undergo metamorphic change when the surrounding rock did, or a rock that survived a destructive geologic process.

Some geologic processes are destructive or transformative of structures or minerals, and when a process is not complete or does not completely destroy certain features, the left-over feature is a relict of what was there before. For example, relict permafrost is an area of ancient permafrost which remains despite a change in climate which would prohibit new permafrost from forming or it could be a fragment of ancient soil or sediment found in a younger stratum. A relict sediment is an area of ancient sediment which remains unburied despite changes in the surrounding environment. In pedology, the study of soil formation and classification, ancient soil found in the geologic record is called a paleosol, material formed in the distant past on what was then the surface. A relict paleosol is still found on the surface, and yet is known to have been formed under conditions radically different from the present climate and topography.

In mineralogy, a relict mineral is a surviving mineral from a parent rock that underwent a destructive or transformative process. For example, serpentinite is a kind of rock formed in a process called serpentinization, in which a host mineral produces a pseudomorph, and the original mineral is eventually replaced and/or destroyed, but is still present until the process is complete.

Within geomorphology a relict landform is a landform that took form from geomorphic processes that are not active at present. In a Scandinavian context, this is often meant to imply that relict landforms were formed before the last glaciation and survived it under cold-based parts of the ice sheet. Climatic geomorphologist Julius Büdel estimated that 95% of mid-latitude landforms are relict.

== See also ==
- Hadean zircon – Oldest-surviving crustal material from the Earth's earliest geological time period
