= Rainwash =

Washing away of loose surface material by rainwater

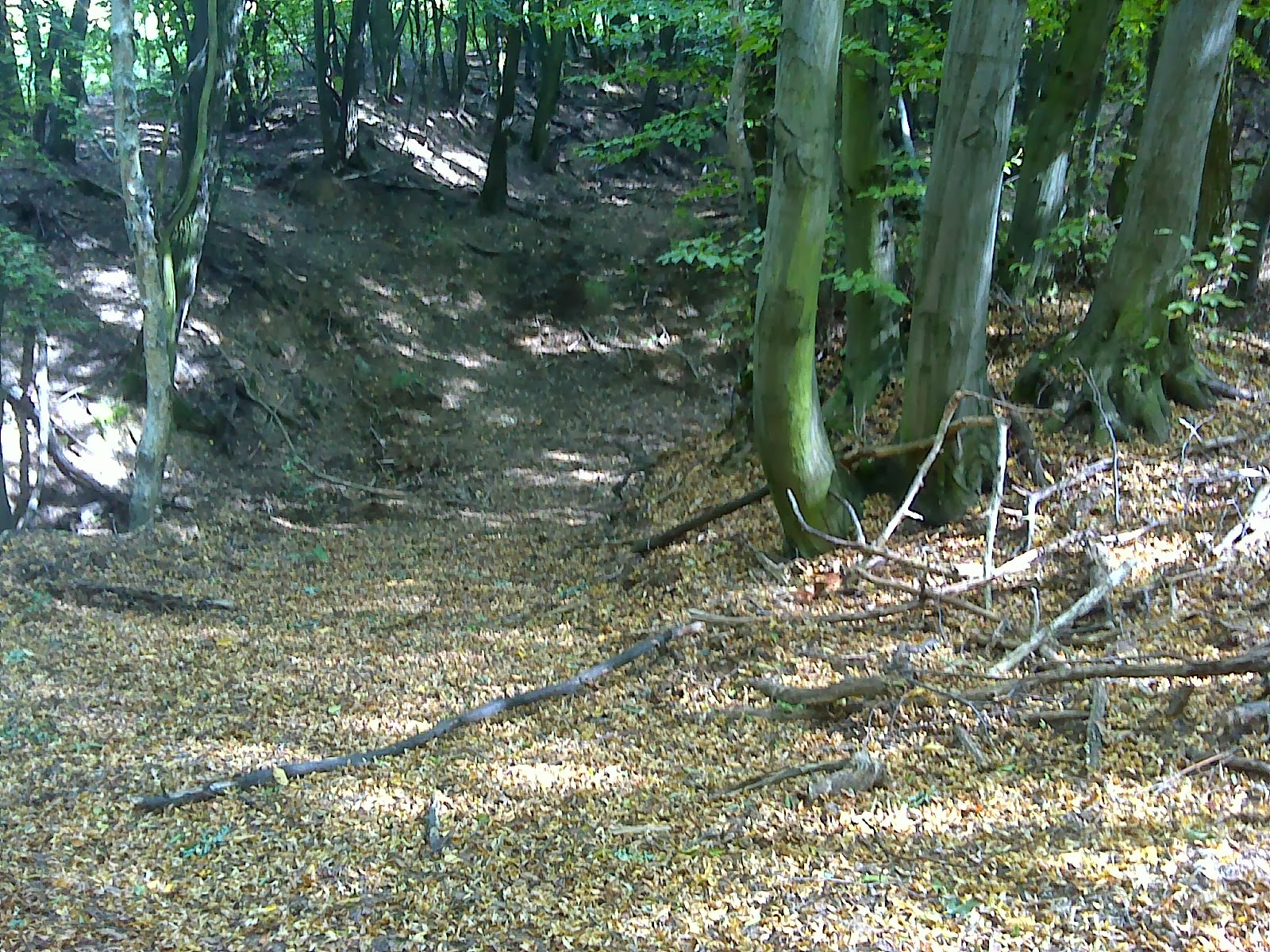
Example of rainwash

Rainwash, also spelled rain-wash or rain wash or sometimes called hillwash, is a process of erosion in which loose surface material is carried away by rainwater that has reached the surface, but has not yet become concentrated into streams. The term is also applied to the movement under the force of gravity of material loosened by rainwater, or to the material itself.

Rainwash is sometimes regarded as a combination of two processes: rain-splash, which is the detachment and movement of small soil particles from raindrop impact, and soil-wash, in which material is moved downslope by surface water flow.
