= Sheet erosion =

Even erosion of substrate along a wide area

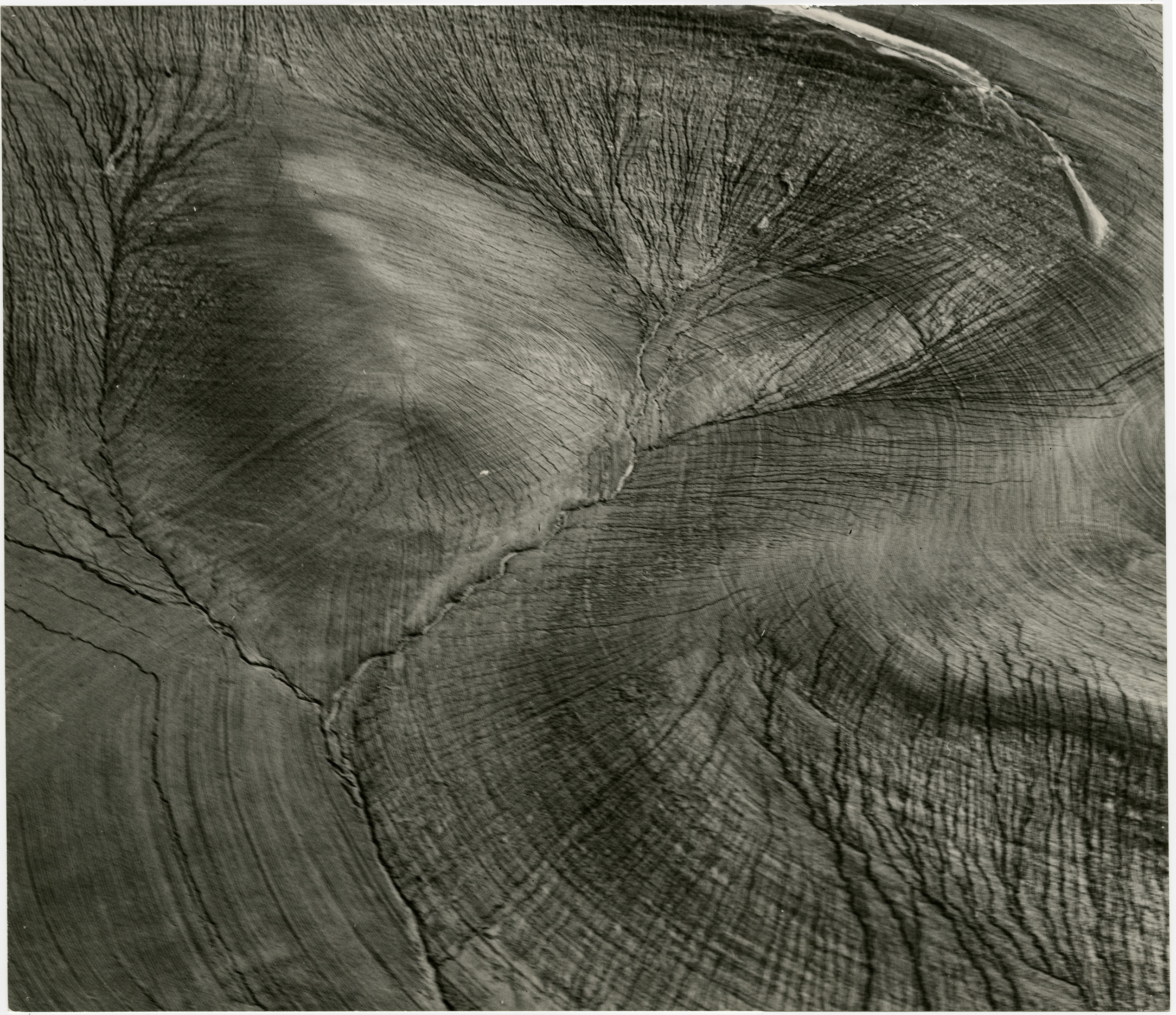
Sheet erosion, Pullman, Washington, 1946

Sheet erosion or sheet wash is the even erosion of substrate along a wide area. It occurs in a wide range of settings such as coastal plains, hill slopes, floodplains, beaches, savanna plains and semi-arid plains. Water moving fairly uniformly with a similar thickness over a surface is called sheet flow, and is the cause of sheet erosion. Sheet erosion implies that any flow of water that causes the erosion is not canalized. If a hillslope surface contains many irregularities, sheet erosion may give way to erosion along small channels called rills, which can then converge forming gullies. However, sheet erosion may occur despite some limited unevenness in the sheet flow arising from clods of earth, rock fragments, or vegetation.

Sheet erosion occurs in two steps. First, rainsplash dislodges small particles of the substrate and then the particles are carried away, usually short distances, by a thin and uniform layer of water (sheet flow). Transport by the sheet flow is usually over small distances, meaning that sheet erosion is a low magnitude process. However, the frequency over time with which this occurs may be high, compensating for the small change observed in each individual episode of sheet erosion. A sheetflood can be distinguished from an ordinary sheet flow by its much greater magnitude and much lesser frequency. Sheetfloods have been associated by various scientists with a number of causes, including high-intensity rain, low relief, lack of vegetation, low permeability of the substrate, strong weather contrast between seasons, slope form and climate change. Sheetfloods are commonly turbulent while sheetflow may be laminar or turbulent.

Sheet erosion is common in recently ploughed fields and bare ground where the substrate, typically soil, is not consolidated. The resulting loss of material by sheet erosion may result in the destruction of valuable topsoils. Tough grass, such as vetiver, hinders the development of sheet flow. The sheet erosion caused by a single rainstorm may account for the loss of up to hundred tons of small particles in an acre.

It has been argued that in the late Neoproterozoic Era, sheet erosion was a dominant erosion process due to the lack of plants on land. As such, sheet erosion may have contributed to shaping important landforms like the Sub-Cambrian peneplain that covers much of the Baltic Shield.

== See also ==
- Hillslope evolution
- Pediment (geology)
- Soil erosion
- Surface runoff
