= Fluvio-thermal erosion =

Erosion process in geomorphology

In geomorphology fluvio-thermal erosion is the combined mechanical and thermal erosion of an unfrozen river or stream against ice-rich soils and sediments. The erosional process includes the thawing of ice sediments by a strong water flow and once the surface is unfrozen, mechanical erosion occurs only if hydraulic forces are powerful enough to incise the riverbank material. This kind of erosion sometimes causes the banks to collapse into the river, and when this occurs collapses are commonly controlled by ice wedges. Rivers where this process has been observed include the Lena, the Colville River delta, and the Yukon River.

The Yakutia region in Central Siberia, where the Lena River is located, is an exceptional point of interest to study this type of erosion based on its record low temperatures and extreme thickness of permafrost. During the winter when water level is low, a thick sheet of ice forms on top of the Lena River, that is sometimes as much as 2 m thick. Seasonal floods caused by rapid snowmelt and irregular storms then break the ice apart in the summer, exposing the banks of the river to the power of erosion. There are two stages to this process: the first is the breakup of the ice and the second is the flooding. Over the course of just a few days in May or June, water discharge can increase by 10x its velocity. The force of the water causes the ice sitting on top of the river to break apart, and these broken pieces are thrust up onto the riverbanks, sometimes forming an ice barrier that as high as 10m tall that will protect the banks from erosion for a short time. However, as the flood continues, the warmth and mechanical energy from the water melts the ice barrier, giving way for the fluvio-thermal erosion of the frozen riverbanks. For the Lena, the banks are observed to retreat approximately 40 m per year.

Based on lab models carried out in a cold room, high water temperature, ice temperature, and discharge are shown to be the main contributors of thermal erosion, whereas high ice content in the soil is shown to slow down the thermal erosion process. Melting of the ice within a porous material reduces the strength of the material, rendering it easily breakable and removable. During the melting period of a periglacial river in the summer, due to a relatively high water discharge, the unfrozen sediments are weathered away. In conclusion, water discharge in permanent contact with permafrost banks creates a combination of thermal and mechanical erosion.
