= Siegfried Passarge =

German geographer (1866–1958)

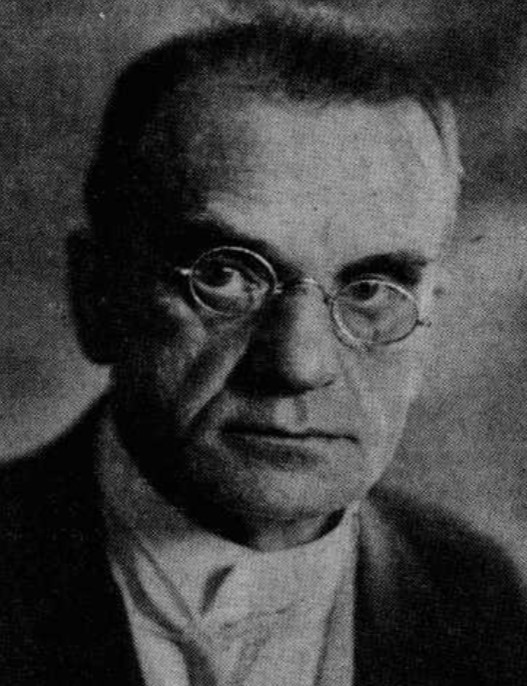
- Born: 28 November 1866; Königsberg, Kingdom of Prussia
- Died: 26 July 1958 (aged 91); Bremen, West Germany
- Citizenship: Germany
- Scientific career
- Fields: Geomorphology
- Workplaces: University of Breslau; University of Hamburg

Otto Karl Siegfried Passarge (28 November 1866 – 26 July 1958) was a German geographer from East Prussia.

== Life ==
Siegfried Passarge was born in Königsberg, the son of travel writer Ludwig Passarge. He attended Collegium Fridericianum, and after graduation studied geography in Berlin and Jena. He also trained in medicine, and worked as a doctor during his military service.

In 1894 Passarge took part in an expedition to Adamawa, at the northern boundary of the former German colony of Cameroon. From 1896 to 1899 Passarge worked as a geologist and surveyor for the British West Charterland Company in South Africa, during which time he made extensive ethnographic studies of the Khoisan and Bantu. In 1901–1902 he took part in an expedition to the Orinoco, followed by travel in Algeria in 1906 and 1907. His travel memoirs record his experiences, including the violences he committed whilst in Africa.

From 1904–1905 Passarge held the post of Associate Professor of Geography in Berlin and in 1905 he became professor of geography in Breslau. In 1908 he joined the Colonial Institute in Hamburg, where he worked until 1936. He theorised that it should be possible for geographers to set up a taxonomic system for landforms, in much the same way as the biological sciences, although he favoured an empirical, descriptive system rather than a genetic one.

Passarge's theories of racial geography (expounded in the 1920s in Das Judentum als landschaftskundlich-ethnologisches Problem) were embraced by the Nazi Party after 1933. On 11 November 1933, he was among the signatories of the commitment of the professors at German universities and colleges to Adolf Hitler and the Nazi state.

== Works (selection) ==
- Die Kalahari, 1904
- Südafrika, 1908
- Physiologische Morphologie, 1912
- Die Grundlagen der Landschaftskunde, 3 Bde. 1919–1920
- Die Landschaftsgürtel der Erde, Breslau: Ferdinand Hirt 1923
- Das Buch vom Kahal, 2 Bände. Leipzig: Hammer-Verlag 1928
- Das Judentum als landschaftskundlich-ethnologisches Problem, München: J. F. Lehmanns Verlag 1929
- Geographische Völkerkunde, Berlin: Safari-Verlag 1951
