= Laktionov Island =

Island in the Antarctica

- Location of Laktionov Island

- Location in Antarctica Laktionov Island (Antarctic Peninsula)

Geography
- Location: Antarctica
- Coordinates: 65°46′S 65°46′W

Administration
- Administered under the Antarctic Treaty System

Demographics
- Population: Uninhabited

Laktionov Island is an island 4 km (2 nmi) long, lying 7 km (4 nmi) northeast of Jurva Point, Renaud Island, in the Biscoe Islands of Antarctica. It was first accurately shown on an Argentine government chart of 1957. The island was named by the UK Antarctic Place-Names Committee in 1959 after Aleksandr F. Laktionov (died 1965), a Soviet sea ice specialist in the Arctic and Antarctic Research Institute, Leningrad, 1927–65, who became head of the Department of Oceanography, Ice Forecasting and River Mouths.

== See also ==
- List of Antarctic and sub-Antarctic islands
