= Azonal =

Geographical terminology

In geography, azonal is an adjective that refers to processes or things that are not restricted to any climate zone. It can be used to describe soils, landforms, geomorphic processes or vegetation. Volcanism and mountain-related processes are examples of azonal processes as they are largely independent of Earth's climate belts. In some climatic environments azonal geomorphologic processes may take distinct characteristics. For example, river activity is common across the globe, but in periglacial environments it causes spring floods from snowmelt, freezing and break-up cycles, and sometimes fluvio-thermal erosion.

== See also ==
- Climatic geomorphology
