= Sandplain =

Geographical feature

A sandplain is an area where the soil is sand deposited from elsewhere by processes such as wind or ocean, rather than direct weathering of bedrock.

Sandplains are quite flat. There may be dune systems, and given time and the right conditions these may form eolianite ridges, but other than that there is little to give a sandplain any topographical character.

Inland sandplains are often extremely infertile, because the sand is often low in nutrients when deposited, plus the good drainage means any nutrients are rapidly leached away.

Coastal sandplains in intertidal zones like those seen in the Wadden Sea in western Europe for example, are wet with nutrients added continuously, so they can often support a very rich and important fauna of birds, worms, mussels, etc..

In North America, sandplains are often vegetated by pine barrens. In Western Australia, kwongan is the dominant vegetation.

== See also ==
- Outwash plain
