= Pediment (geology) =

Very gently sloping inclined bedrock surface

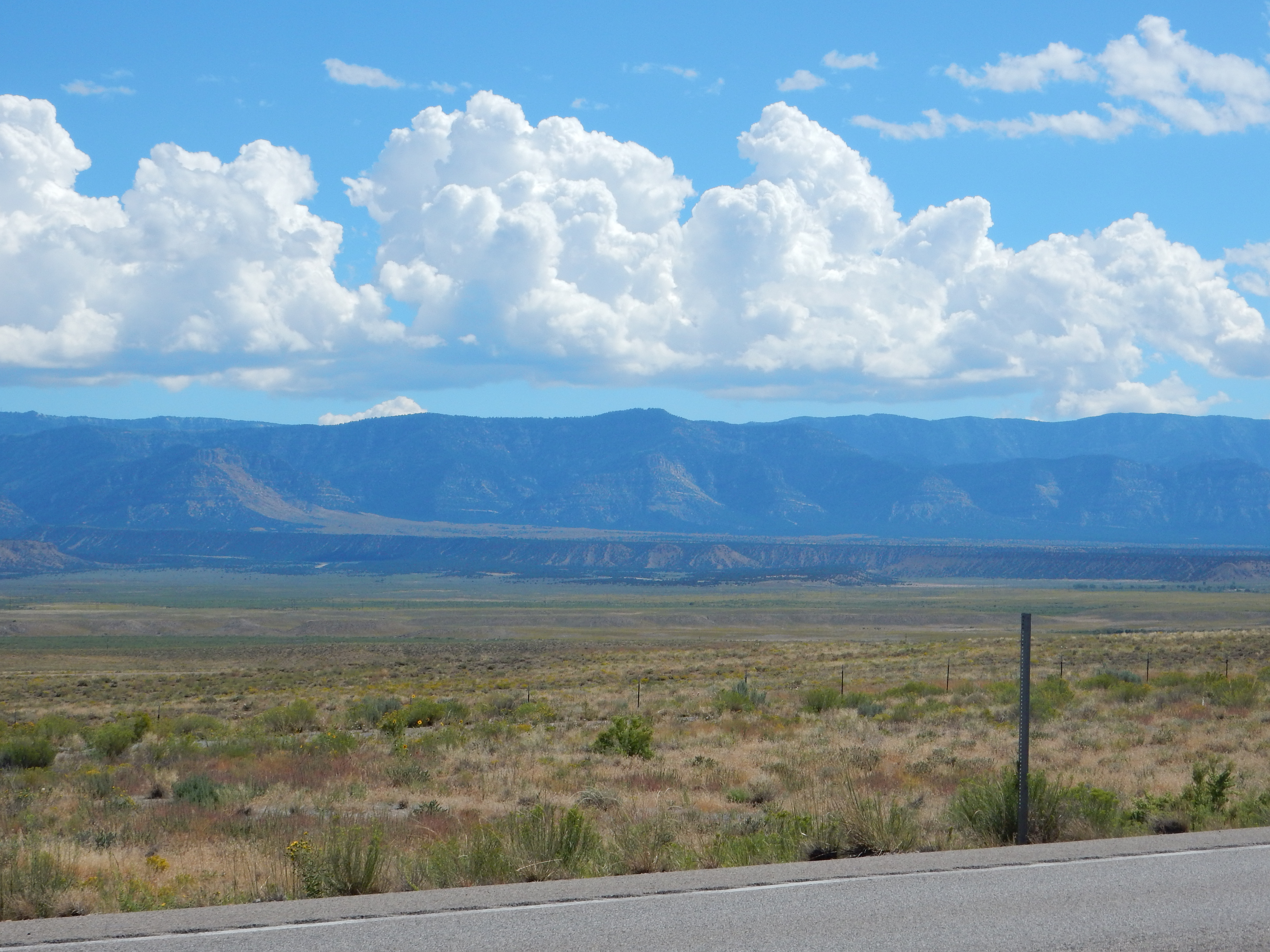
Pediment surface at base of Book Cliffs, Utah

A pediment, also known as a concave slope or waning slope, is a very gently sloping (0.5°–7°) inclined bedrock surface. It is typically a concave surface sloping down from the base of a steeper retreating desert cliff, escarpment, or surrounding a monadnock or inselberg, but may persist after the higher terrain has eroded away.

Pediments are erosional surfaces. A pediment develops when sheets of running water (sheet floods) wash over it in intense rainfall events. It may be thinly covered with fluvial gravel that has washed over it from the foot of mountains produced by cliff retreat erosion.

A pediment is not to be confused with a bajada, which is a merged group of alluvial fans. Bajadas also slope gently from an escarpment, but are composed of material eroded from canyons in the escarpment and redeposited on the bajada, rather than of bedrock with a thin veneer of gravel.

== Description ==
Pediments were originally recognized as the upper part of smoothly sloping (0.5°-7°) concave piedmont surfaces surrounding mountains in arid regions. The lower part of the piedmont is a bajada, with the distinction being that the upper pediment surface is cut into bedrock (with possibly a thin veneer of alluvium) and is thus a result of erosion, while the lower bajada is aggradational (formed by accumulation of fresh sediments). Above the pediment, the slope abruptly increases, with an angle of 15° to nearly vertical. This creates a well-defined knickpoint at the base of the higher terrain.

The lower part of the pediment may be buried under younger bajada deposits. This is described as a concealed pediment. An originally level pediment that is subsequently dissected is described as a dissected pediment, though the term has also been applied to bedrock surfaces that were never level.

It is not uncommon to find isolated erosional remnants on a pediment.

Individual pediments formed where canyons emerge from the high ground may merge to form coalescing pediments that may remain when the higher terrain is entirely eroded away. Coalescence of pediments over a large area results in a pediplain. A pediplain is distinguished from a peneplain because a pediplain has a thin veneer of gravel and is relatively steep, while a peneplain is surfaced with deep residual soil and is extremely level, with slopes of less than 55 feet per mile (10 meters per km). It has even been suggested that there are no true peneplains, and most identified peneplains are actually pediplains.

== Occurrence ==
Pediments are commonly found in arid to semiarid climates and are particularly well known from the western United States. However, they are also found along the forearc of the Andes in South America and in South Africa. More recently, it has been recognized that pediments are formed in temperate and humid climates and in a variety of tectonic settings, and that the character of the bedrock is not critical to their formation.

Ancient pediment surfaces have been found in the geologic record as far back as the Proterozoic.

== Processes responsible for carving pediments ==
The processes responsible for creating a pediment, and especially for creating a sharp knickpoint at the juncture of the pediment with higher terrain, have been debated for over a century. It is now recognized that pediments are found in humid as well as arid climates, in many tectonic settings, and on many varieties of bedrock. They are nonetheless not universal features of mountain fronts. This realization has prompted renewed efforts to explain their formation, including through numerical modeling.

Proposed mechanisms of formation include:

- Sheetwash or sheet erosion, in which broad sheets of flowing water evenly remove thin layers of surface material without incising channels.
- Mountain-front retreating by weathering
- Lateral planation or erosion by a stream
- Rillwash or rill erosion, in which flow is concentrated in numerous closely spaced minute channels.

Later researchers looked to a combination of these mechanisms to explain pedimentation. In numerical models that couple granitic bedrock weathering and episodic stream transport of sediments, pediments emerge spontaneously. Pediment formation is promoted by arid conditions that hinder vegetation, reduce soil cohesion, and contribute to channel bank instability. Localized flooding on terrain with high infiltration rates also promotes pedimentation. These conditions all reduce incision rates. The models correctly predict that pediments are more common in hydrologically open basins than in hydrologically closed basins.

== History ==
In 1877 Grove Karl Gilbert first observed pediments in the Henry Mountains in Utah. He described the formation as "hills of planation cut across the upturned edges of tilted beds". Gilbert believed the origin of pediments in the Henry Mountains are due to stream planation and active erosion of deserts. This theory was advocated by Sydney Paige (1912), and Douglas Johnson (1932). Johnson identified three zones of pediments.
