= Jean Tricart =

French geographer (1920-2003)

Jean Tricart (16 September 1920 – 4 May 2003) was a French geomorphologist. In 1948, he became a professor at the University of Strasbourg, where he remained for the rest of his career. The Tricart's doctoral thesis dealt with the Paris Basin and resulted in a publication acclaimed in France. He often collaborated with his friend André Cailleux. From 1962 to 1974, he and Callieux published five works on the subject of geomorphology and climate. Most of his works were published in French.

Tricart considered that he had, 'a broad systems approach to landform genesis.'. This paper is response to Denys Brunsden's 'Tablets of Stone'.

He was awarded the Busk Medal by the Royal Geographical Society in 1985.
