= Etchplain =

Plain where the bedrock has been subject to considerable subsurface weathering

An etchplain is a plain where the bedrock has been subject to considerable "etching" or subsurface weathering. Etchplanation is the process forming etchplains. Contrary to what the name might suggest, etchplains are seldom completely flat and usually display some relief, as weathering of the bedrock does not advance uniformly. This means that weathering is unrelated to the flatness which might be derivative of various other processes of planation including peneplanation and pediplanation. Erosion of etchplains can result in the exposure of inselbergs such as bornhardt and tors. Generally the topography exposed at a stripped etchplain, that is an etch surface, after erosion of regolith is one with many irregularities as result of structurally defined areas of rock strength.

A distinction can be made between etchplains and etch surfaces as the latter may or may not be flat and can represent the landform arising from the stripping of an etchplain.

As climate changes, arid and semi-arid periods of pediplanation may alternate with more humid periods of etchplanation resulting in the formation of flattish surfaces (peneplains) of mixed origin (polygenetic).

During wet seasons deep weathering is more pronounced producing regolith which is then stripped away by erosion during subsequent dry seasons. The rate of stripping must exceed that of regolith production by deep weathering, otherwise deep-seated basal surfaces would not be revealed.

The African Surface formed 70–40 million years ago is an example of an etchplain.

== History of the concept ==
The term 'etchplain' or 'etched peneplain' was originally coined to describe surfaces in East Africa by E. J. Wayland in 1934 and Bailey Willis in 1936. This last geologist applied the term etched peneplain to the Tanganyika Plateau. Julius Büdel developed the concept further in the second half of the 20th century, but never did use the term 'etchplain'. The term came for a long time to be associated with landscapes in the tropics or with a tropical climate but since the 1980s it has also been used to describe flat weathered landscapes at higher latitudes.

== See also ==
- Strandflat – Type of landform found in high-latitude areas
- Sub-Mesozoic hilly peneplains – Landscape in Scandinavia of undulating hills and joint valleys
