= Friedrich Wilhelm Conrad Eduard Bornhardt =

German geologist and explorer (1864 – 1946)

Friedrich Wilhelm Conrad Eduard Bornhardt (20 April 1864 Braunschweig – 2 December 1946 Goslar) was a German geologist, engineer and explorer, and was Director of the Berlin College of Mines (Bergakademie) from 1907 to 1916.

He explored and set out the groundwork of the geology of German East Africa. His published work consisted of two parts – an account of his travels and his geological findings. In 1896 he set out from Lindi to Lake Malawi where he stayed for ten months undertaking eight exploratory trips of the region. Afterwards he returned to the coast to write up his geology journals.

In 1897 he explored the protectorate of Dar es Salaam as far as the Ruvuma Region, the Zanzibar Archipelago and the Usambara Mountains, carrying out some thirteen journeys. In all he covered about 6,000 kilometres (3,700 mi) and prepared maps of the geology and vegetation of the regions he traversed. Bornhardt documented the existence of coal reserves in present-day Tanzania in 1896 when he explored the Songwe Kiwira area, described the Karoo stratigraphy and surveyed several coal fields.

The rose-red mineral bornhardtite from Lautenthal in the Harz Mountains of Lower Saxony, is named in his honour. He first coined the term "inselberg" to describe an isolated massif, while the term "bornhardt", describing a particular type of mountain, is used in his honour.

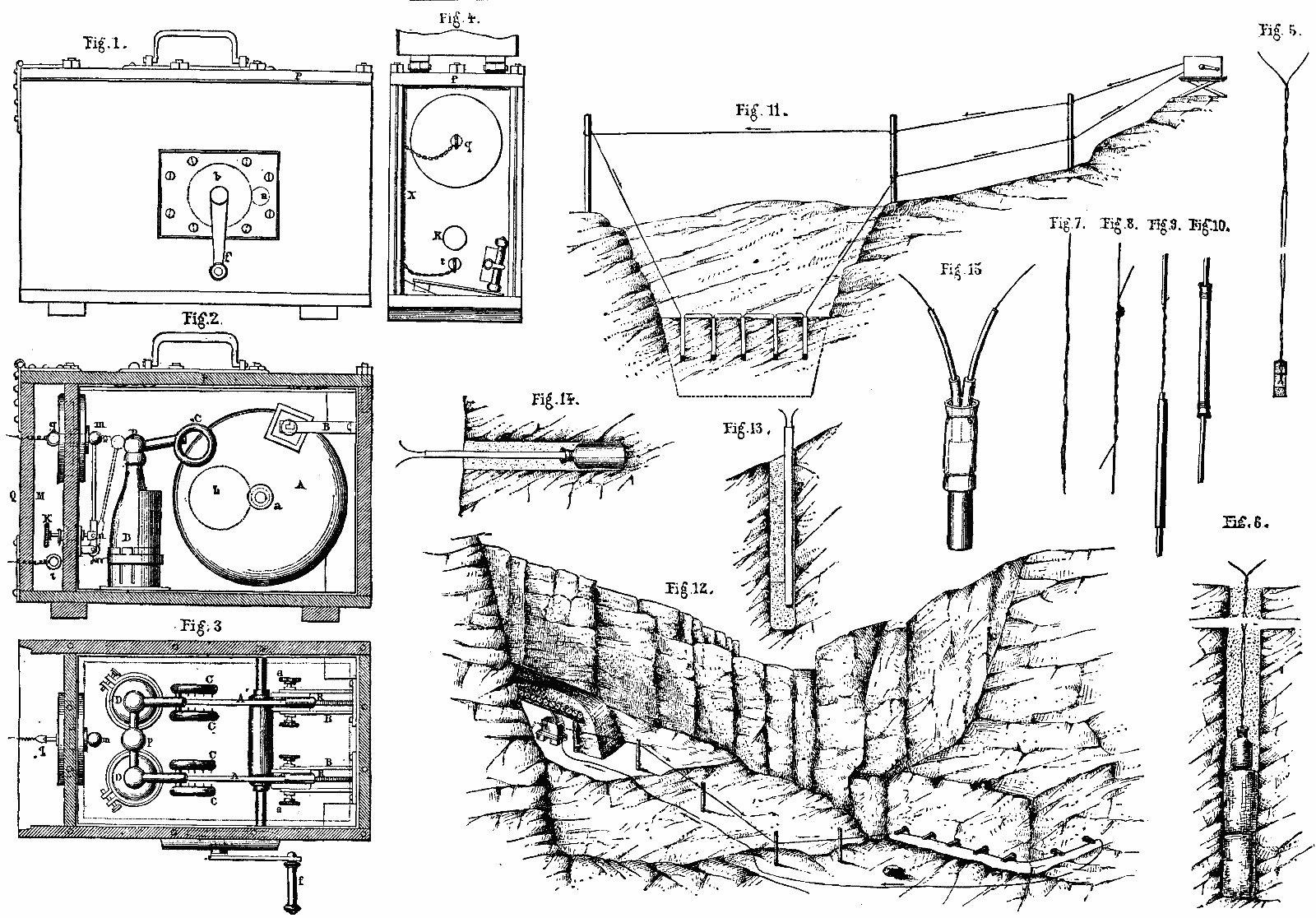

Bornhardt invented a number of applications for the mining industry. One such was a hand-powered electrical generator, much used in France, for detonating explosives in rock-blasting.

== Publications ==
- Bornhardt, W (1989). "Uber die bergmännischen und geologischen Ergebnisse seiner Reisen in Deutsch-Ostafrika". Z. Deutsch. Geol. Ges.: 50, 59–73.
- Bornhardt, W (1898). "Die Schwefelquellen von Amboni". Dtsch. Kolonialbl. 9: 268–272.
- Bornhardt, W (1899). "Über nutzbare Lagerstätten Deutsch-Ostafrikas". Z. Prakt. Geol. 7: 217–218.
- Bornhardt, W (1900). "Deutsch-Ostafrika". Zur Oberflächen-Gestaltung und Geologie Deutsch-Ostafrikas. Vol. 7. Berlin: Dietrich Reimer.
