= Masoko =

Masoko may refer to:

- Masoko, Ward, Rungwe District, Mbeya Region, Tanzania
- Kilwa Masoko, the administrative center of Kilwa District, Lindi Region, Tanzania
