= Ilima =

Ilima or ʻIlima may refer to:

- Ilima (ward), administrative ward in Tanzania
- Sida fallax, a plant native to Hawaiʻi, the island flower of Oʻahu
