= Bujela =

Ward in Rungwe, Mbeya, Tanzania

Bujela Kata ya Bujela
- Ward
- Location within Tanzania
- Coordinates: 9.36°S 33.703°E
- Country: Tanzania
- Region: Mbeya Region
- District: Rungwe District
- Ward: Bujela
- Established: 1984

Government
  - Type: Council
  - District Executive Director: Loema Peter Isaya]
  - MP: Saul Henry Amon
  - Chairman: Ezekiel Mwakota
  - Councilor: Amnon Mchapi Mwamalala

Area
  - Total: 34.80 km^{2} (13.44 sq mi)
- Elevation: 937 m (3,074 ft)

Population (2016)
  - Total: 6,149
  - Density: 176.7/km^{2} (457.6/sq mi)
- Time zone: UTC+3 (EAT)
- Postcode: 53520
- Area code: 025
- Website: District Website

Bujela is an administrative ward in the Rungwe district of the Mbeya Region of Tanzania. The ward covers an area of 34.80 km^{2} (13.44 sq mi) with an average elevation of 937 m (3,074 ft).

In 2016 the Tanzania National Bureau of Statistics report there were 6,149 people in the ward, from 5,579 in 2012, from 6,090 in 2002. The ward has 180 inhabitants per square kilometre (470/sq mi).

== Villages and hamlets ==
The ward has 5 villages, and 16 hamlets.

- Mpombo
  - Mpombo
  - Salima
- Kyambambembe
  - Makina
  - Makuyu
- Nsongola
  - Kilange
  - Lupila
  - Nkuyu
  - Nsongola
- Bujela
  - Bujege
  - Bujela
  - Busyala
  - Ntuso
- Segela
  - Brazil
  - Ipyana
  - Segela
  - katonya
