= Kyimo =

Ward in Mbeya, Tanzania

- Ward
- Location within Tanzania
- Coordinates: 9°13′S 33°35′E
- Country: Tanzania
- Region: Mbeya Region
- District: Rungwe District
- Ward: Kyimo

Government
  - Type: Council

Population (2016)
  - Total: 15,466
- Time zone: UTC+3 (EAT)
- Postcode: 53509
- Area code: 025
- Website: District Website

Kyimo is an administrative ward in the Rungwe district of the Mbeya Region of Tanzania. In 2016 the Tanzania National Bureau of Statistics report there were 15,466 people in the ward, from 14,033 in 2012.

== Neighborhoods ==
The ward has 5 neighborhoods.

- Ilenge
- Katabe
- Kibisi
- Kyimo
- Syukula
