= Kawetele =

Ward in Mbeya, Tanzania

- Ward
- Location within Tanzania
- Coordinates: 9.478°S 33.182°E
- Country: Tanzania
- Region: Mbeya Region
- District: Rungwe District
- Ward: Kawetele

Government
  - Type: Council

Population (2016)
  - Total: 6,068
- Time zone: UTC+3 (EAT)
- Postcode: 53505
- Area code: 025
- Website: District Website

Kawetele is an administrative ward in Rungwe District, Mbeya Region, Tanzania. In 2016 the Tanzania National Bureau of Statistics report there were 6,068 people in the ward, from 5,506 in 2012.

== Neighborhoods ==
The ward has 3 neighborhoods.

- Igogwe
- Kawetele chini
- Kawetele juu
