= Iponjola =

Ward in Mbeya, Tanzania

- Ward
- Location within Tanzania
- Coordinates: 9.478°S 33.182°E
- Country: Tanzania
- Region: Mbeya Region
- District: Rungwe District
- Ward: Iponjola

Government
  - Type: Council
  - District Executive Director: Loema Peter Isaya
  - MP: Saul Henry Amon
  - Chairman: Ezekiel Mwakota
  - Councilor: Moyo Njayasya Mbamba

Population (2016)
  - Total: 6,633
- Time zone: UTC+3 (EAT)
- Postcode: 53539
- Area code: 025
- Website: District Website

Iponjola is an administrative ward in Rungwe District, Mbeya Region, Tanzania. In 2016 the Tanzania National Bureau of Statistics report there were 6,633 people in the ward.

== Villages and hamlets ==
The ward has 4 villages, and 13 hamlets.

- Iponjola
  - Iponjola
  - Ngena
  - Njelenje
- Ilalabwe
  - Bujesi
  - Igisa
  - Ilalabwe
  - Ipangalwigi
- Lugombo
  - Bujela
  - Ipande
  - Lugombo
  - Lupaso
- Ngana
  - Ibagha
  - Ngana
