= Nkunga =

Ward of Mbeya Region, Tanzania

Coordinates: 9°12′S 33°30′E

Nkunga is an administrative ward in the Rungwe district of the Mbeya Region of Tanzania. According to the 2002 census, the ward has a total population of 14,685.
