= Malindo =

Ward in Rungwe, Mbeya, Tanzania

Malindo Kata ya Malindo
- Ward
- Location within Tanzania
- Coordinates: 9.32322403°S 33.5981809°E
- Country: Tanzania
- Region: Mbeya Region
- District: Rungwe
- Ward: Malindo
- Leadership: legislature

Government
  - Type: District Council
  - District Executive Director: Loema Peter Isaya
  - MP: Saul Henry Amon
  - Chairman: Ezekiel Mwakota
  - Councilor: Nelson John Mwaikambo

Population (2016)
  - Total: 6,569
- Time zone: UTC+3 (EAT)

Malindo is an administrative ward in the Rungwe district of the Mbeya Region of Tanzania. In 2016 the Tanzania National Bureau of Statistics report there were 6,569 people in the ward, from 5,960 in 2012.
