= Rungwe District =

Rungwe
- District
- Wilaya ya Rungwe, Mkoa wa Mbeya
- Rungwe District of Mbeya Region
- Coordinates: 9°15′S 33°40′E
- Country: Tanzania

Area
  - Total: 1,441 km^{2} (556 sq mi)

Population (2022)
  - Total: 273,536
  - Density: 189.8/km^{2} (491.6/sq mi)
- Time zone: UTC+3 (EAT)
- Website: District Website

Rungwe is a district in Mbeya Region, Tanzania. It is bordered to the north by Mbeya Rural District, to the east by Njombe Region, to the southeast by Kyela District, to the southwest by Ileje District, and to the west by Mbeya District.

According to the 2022 Tanzania National Census, the population of Rungwe District was 273,536.

The District Commissioner of Rungwe from 26 June 2016 to 19 June 2021 was Julius Chalya. Vicent Naano Anney was then appointed to the post by President Samia Suluhu Hassan on 19 June 2021. He had previously served as Musoma District Commissioner from 26 June 2016 to 19 June 2021.

== Ethnic groups ==
Most people living in the district are Nyakyusa and Tumbuka people.

== Languages ==
While Swahili is the most common language, as well as the official language of the country, there are also several languages spoken in the district such as Nyakyusa and Tumbuka language.

== Wards ==
Rungwe District is administratively divided into 30 wards:

- Bagamoyo Ward
- Bujela
- Bulyaga
- Ibighi
- Ikama
- Ikuti
- Ilima (ward)
- Iponjola
- Isongole
- Itagata
- Kawetele
- Kikole
- Kinyala
- Kisiba
- Kisondela
- Kiwira
- Kyimo
- Lufingo
- Lupepo
- Makandana
- Malindo
- Masebe
- Masoko, Ward
- Masukulu
- Matwebe
- Mpuguso
- Msasani Ward
- Ndato
- Nkunga
- Suma
- Swaya
