= Ikuti =

- Ward
- Location within Tanzania
- Coordinates: 9°19′S 33°32′E
- Country: Tanzania
- Region: Mbeya Region
- District: Rungwe District

Government
  - Type: Council
  - District Executive Director: Loema Peter Isaya
  - MP: Saul Henry Amon
  - Chairman: Ezekiel Mwakota
  - Councilor: Charles Peter Mwakalinga

Population (2016)
  - Total: 14,366
- Time zone: UTC+3 (EAT)
- Postcode: 53517
- Area code: 025
- Website: District Website

Ikuti is an administrative ward in the Rungwe district of the Mbeya Region of Tanzania. In 2016 the Tanzania National Bureau of Statistics report there were 14,366 people in the ward.

== Villages and hamlets ==
The ward has 6 villages, and 29 hamlets.

- Lyenje
  - Ijugwe
  - Kezalia
  - Kimomo
  - Kitapwa
  - Lyenje
  - Mwantondo
- Ibungu
  - Ibungu
  - Kipya
  - Makata
  - Meega
- Ikuti
  - Butonga
  - Butumba
  - Ibula
  - Ikuti
  - Kagisa
  - Kinyika
  - Lupupu
  - Mabale
- Lumbe
  - Lumbe
  - Nsanga
- Kyobo
  - Igembe
  - Isuga
  - Kitolo
  - Kyobo chini
  - Matale
  - Ng'enge
- Kyobo Juu
  - Kyobo Kati
  - Kyobo juu
  - Lubemba
