= Inselberg =

Isolated, steep rock hill on relatively flat terrain

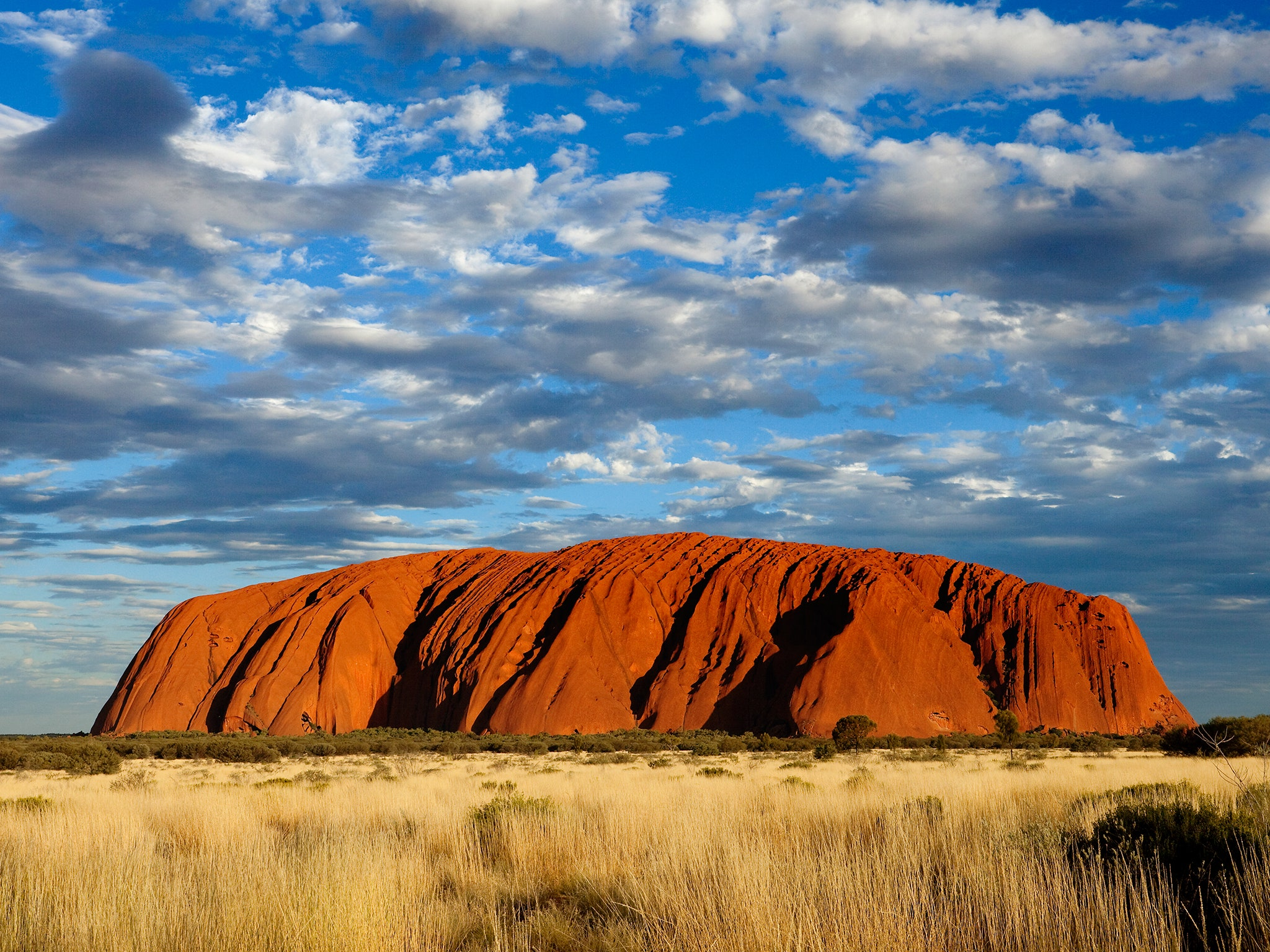
Uluru in Australia

An inselberg or monadnock (/məˈnædnɒk/ mə-NAD-nok) is an isolated rock hill, knob, ridge, or small mountain that rises abruptly from a gently sloping or virtually level surrounding plain. (Note: In Southern Africa, a similar formation of granite is known as a koppie, an Afrikaans word ("little head") from the Dutch diminutive word kopje.) If the inselberg is dome-shaped and formed from granite or gneiss, it can also be called a bornhardt, though not all bornhardts are inselbergs. An inselberg results when a body of rock resistant to erosion, such as granite, occurring within a body of softer rocks, is exposed by differential erosion and lowering of the surrounding landscape.

== Etymology ==
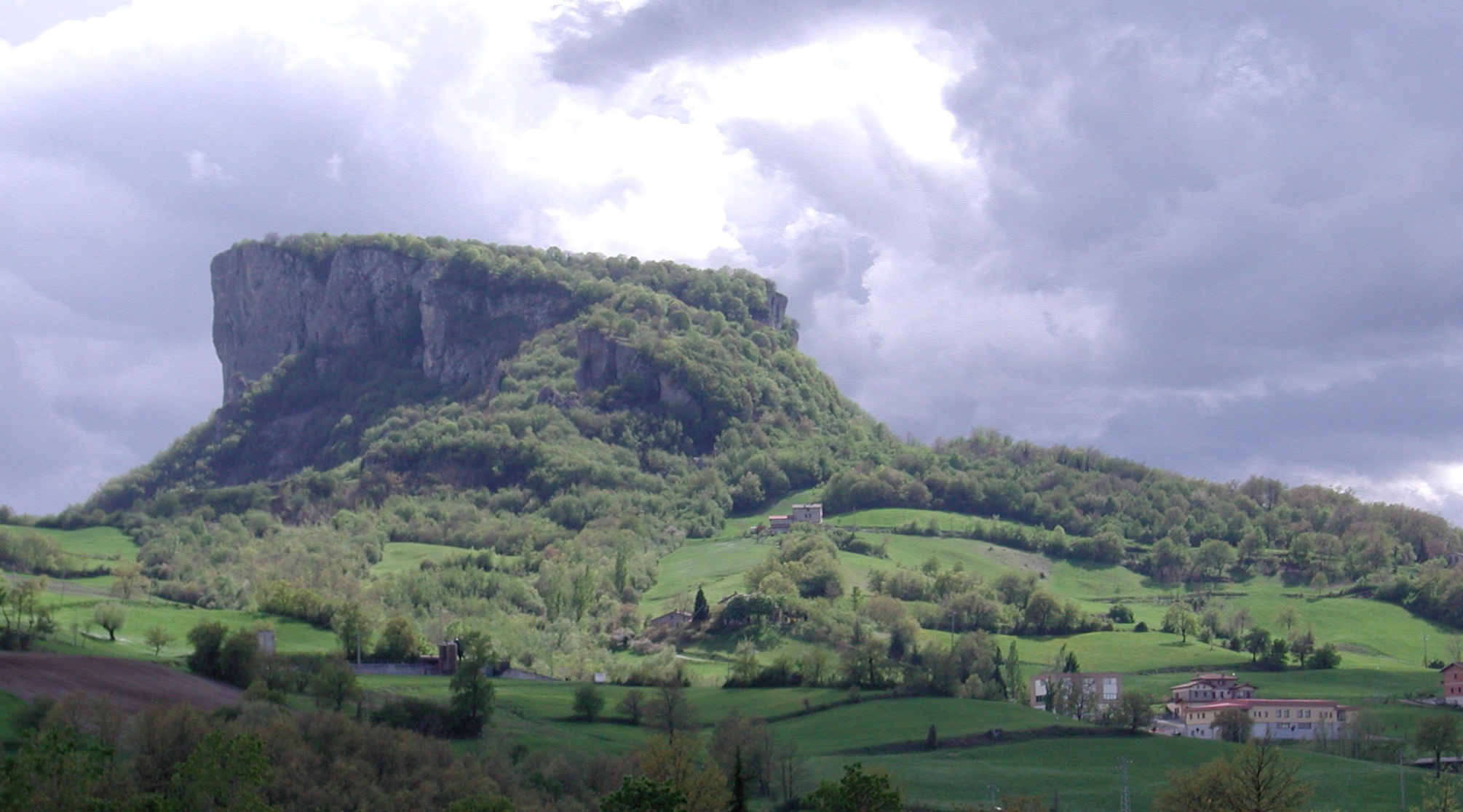
Pietra di Bismantova in the Apennines, Italy

=== Inselberg ===
The word inselberg is a loan word from German, and means "island mountain". The term was coined in 1900 by geologist Wilhelm Bornhardt (1864–1946) to describe the abundance of such features found in eastern Africa. At that time, the term applied only to arid landscape features. However, it has since been used to describe a broader geography and range of rock features, leading to confusion about the precise definition of the term.

In a 1973 study examining the use of the term, one researcher found that the term had been used for features in savannah climates 40% of the time, arid or semi-arid climates 32% of the time, humid-subtropical and arctic 12% of the time, and 6% each in humid-tropical and Mediterranean climates.

=== Monadnock ===
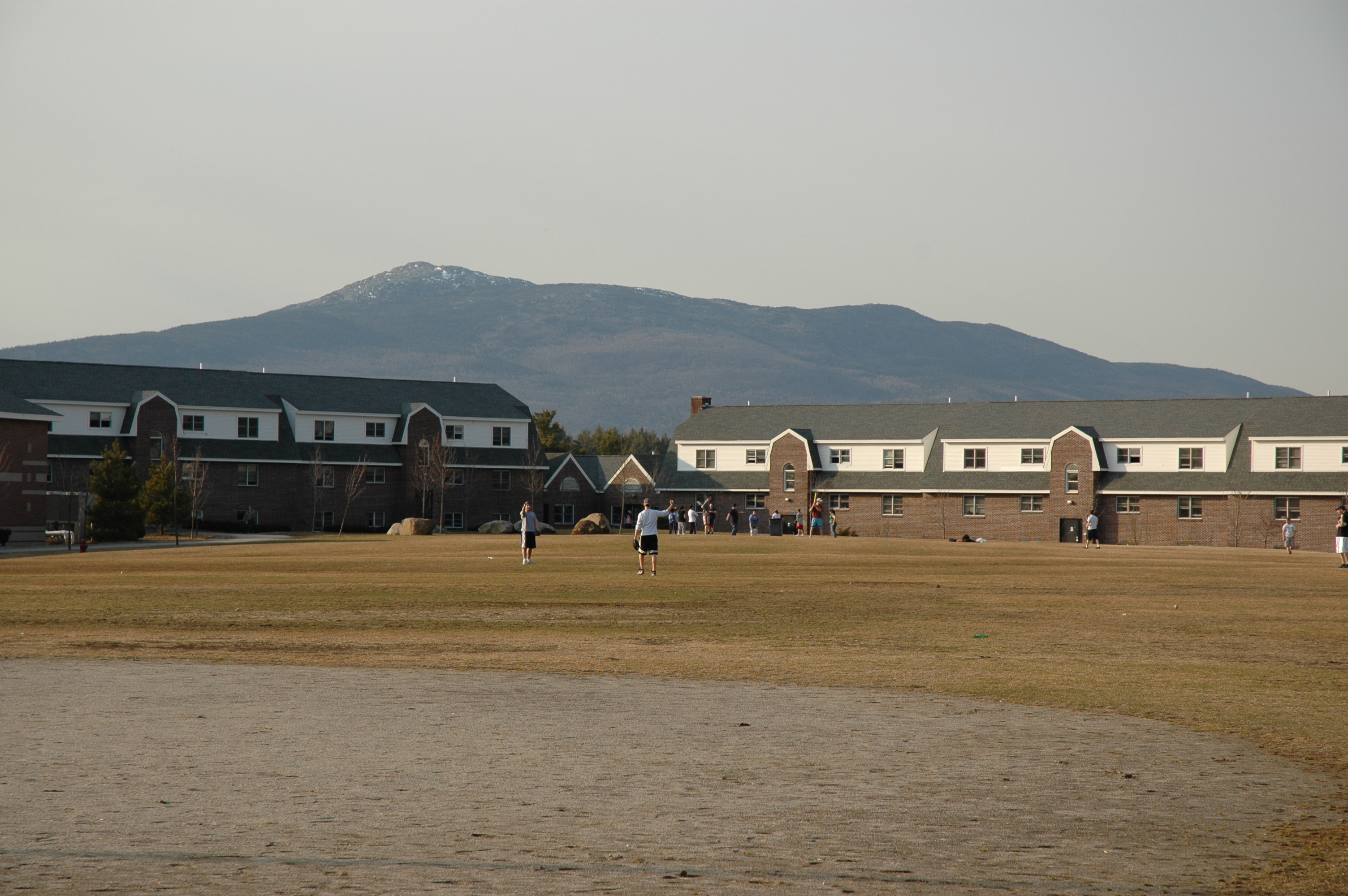
Mount Monadnock in New Hampshire, USA.

Monadnock is derived from an Abenaki term for an isolated hill or a lone mountain that stands above the surrounding area, typically by surviving erosion. Geologists took the name from Mount Monadnock in southwestern New Hampshire. It is thought to derive from either menonadenak (transl. smooth mountain) or menadena (transl. isolated mountain). In this context, monadnock is used to describe a mountain that rises from an area of relatively flat and/or lower terrain. For instance, Mount Monadnock rises 610 metres (2,000 ft) above its surrounding terrain and stands, at 965 m (3,165 ft), nearly 300 m (1,000 ft) higher than any mountain peak within 48 km (30 mi).

== Definition ==
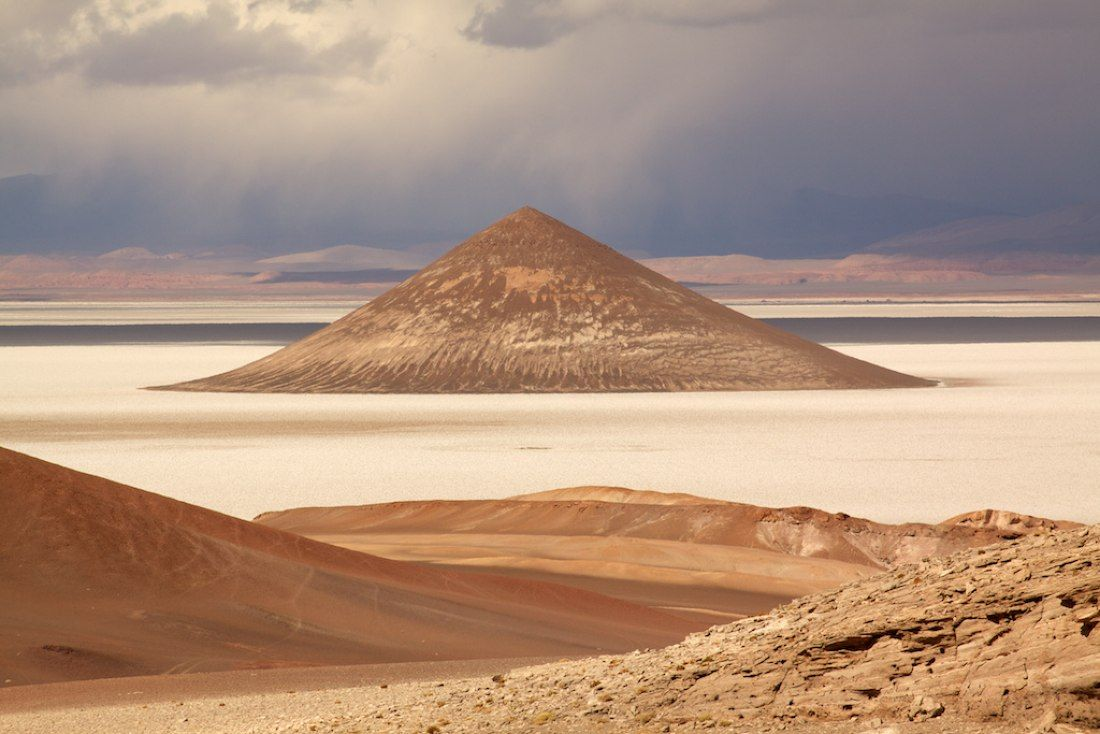
Cono de Arita, a conical sandstone inselberg in the middle of Salar de Arizaro, Argentina

The classification of Anthony Young (1969) distinguishes six types of inselbergs: buttes, conical hills, convex-concave hills, rock crest over regolith-covered slope, rock dome (sugarloaf) and kopje or tor.

A 1972 paper defined inselbergs as "steep-sided isolated hills rising relatively abruptly above gently sloping ground". This definition includes such features as buttes; conical hills with rectilinear sides typically found in arid regions; regolith-covered concave-convex hills; rock crests over regolith slopes; rock domes with near vertical sides; tors (koppies) formed of large boulders but with solid rock cores. Thus, the terms monadnock and inselberg may not perfectly match, though some authors have explicitly argued these terms are completely synonymous.

== Geology ==
=== Geological and geographical patterns ===
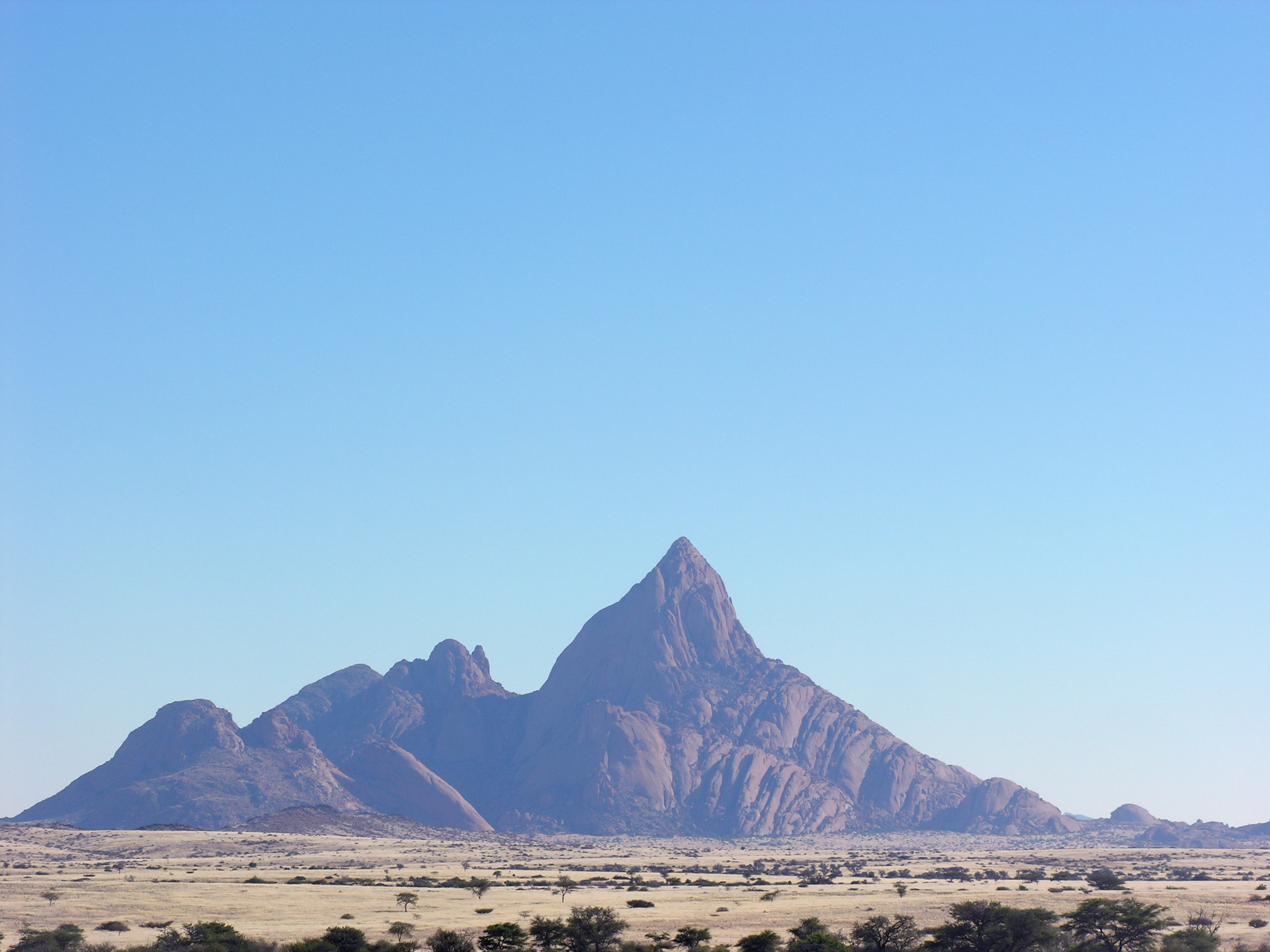
The Spitzkoppe of Namibia, a 670-metre (2,200 ft) granite peak formed by early Cretaceous rifting and magmatism.

Inselbergs are common in eroded and weathered shields. The presence of an inselberg typically indicates the existence of a nearby plateau or highland, or their remnants. This is especially the case for inselbergs composed of sedimentary rock, which will display the same stratigraphic units as this nearby plateau. Once exposed, the inselbergs are destroyed by marginal collapse of joint blocks and exfoliation sheets. This process leaves behind tors perched at their summits and, over time, a talus-bordered residual known as a castle koppie appears. By this association various inselberg fields in Africa and South America are assumed to be the vestiges of eroded etchplains.

=== Location ===
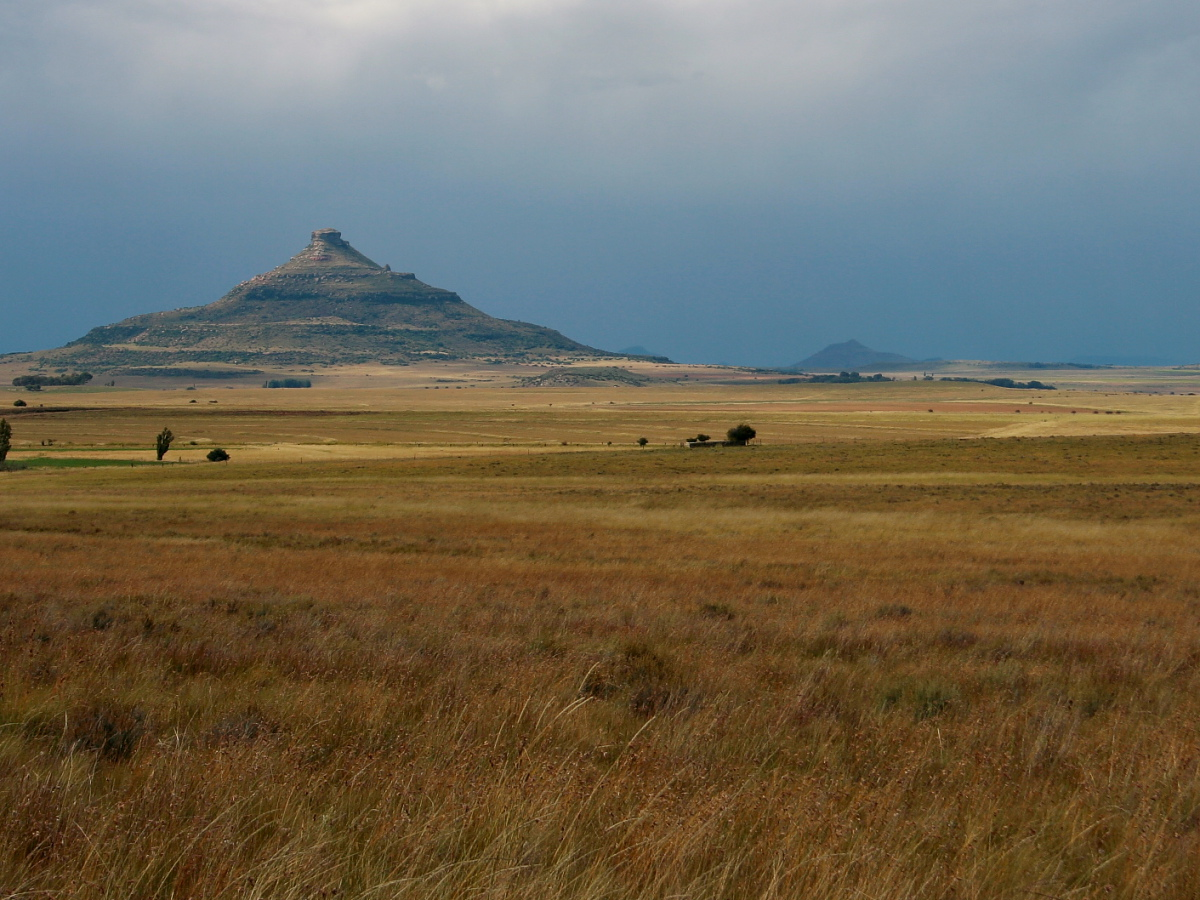
A conical sandstone koppie in the Free State, South Africa

Clusters of inselbergs, called inselberg fields and inselberg plains, occur in various parts of the world, including Tanzania, the Anti-Atlas of Morocco, Northeast Brazil, Namibia, the interior of Angola, and the northern portions of Finland and Sweden. (Note: Albeit its not the usual way of describing it the strandflat of Norway was held by Julius Büdel to be an etchplain with inselbergs.)

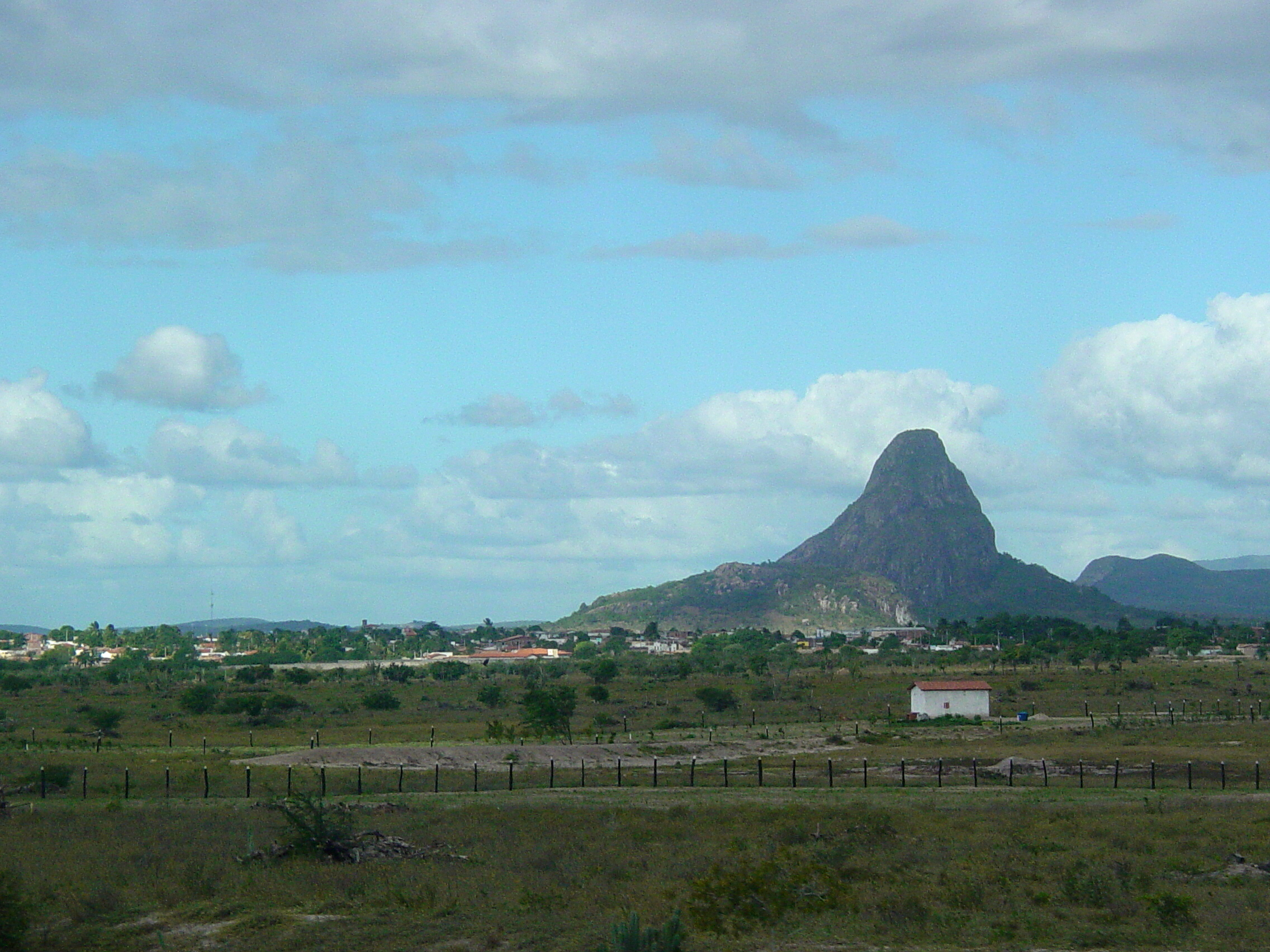
Inselberg in the state of Bahia, northeastern Brazil

The types of rock of which inselbergs are made include granite, gneiss and gabbro. (Note: Cliff Ollier has noted that in Uganda inselbergs are commonly made of granite rock, sometimes of gneiss and never of amphibolite or volcanic rock. According to Ollier protuding quartzite hills tend to form ridges rather than "true inselbergs". Dundret in northern Sweden is made of gabbro.)

=== Origin and development ===
Summarizing the understanding on the origin of inselbergs in 1974, geomorphologist Michael Thomas writes "Hypotheses for the development of inselbergs have been advanced, refuted and reiterated over a period of more than seventy years." Volcanic or other processes may give rise to a body of rock resistant to erosion, inside a body of softer rock such as limestone, which is more susceptible to erosion. When the less resistant rock is eroded away to form a plain, the more resistant rock is left behind as an isolated mountain. The strength of the uneroded rock is often attributed to the tightness of its jointing. (Note: Twidale (1981) "Granitic Inselbergs: …" is a review that follows the Willis 1936 works and Twidale 1971, a series of papers available in 1970 and rock weathering strata and structure reviewed U.C.W. well worth reading as they show by theory and materials the importance of preceding structures, internal solution, subsurface weathering, slips, exfoliation, basal weathering (Young, A. Soils), biological effects, plants, solutes and salt plain catena associations, possible lake rise, but mainly the stripping of rock mass leaving resistant units, sometimes volcanic plugs.)

Inselbergs can be reshaped by ice sheets much the same way as roches moutonnées. In northern Sweden, examples of this type of inselberg are called flyggbergs.

== Ecology ==
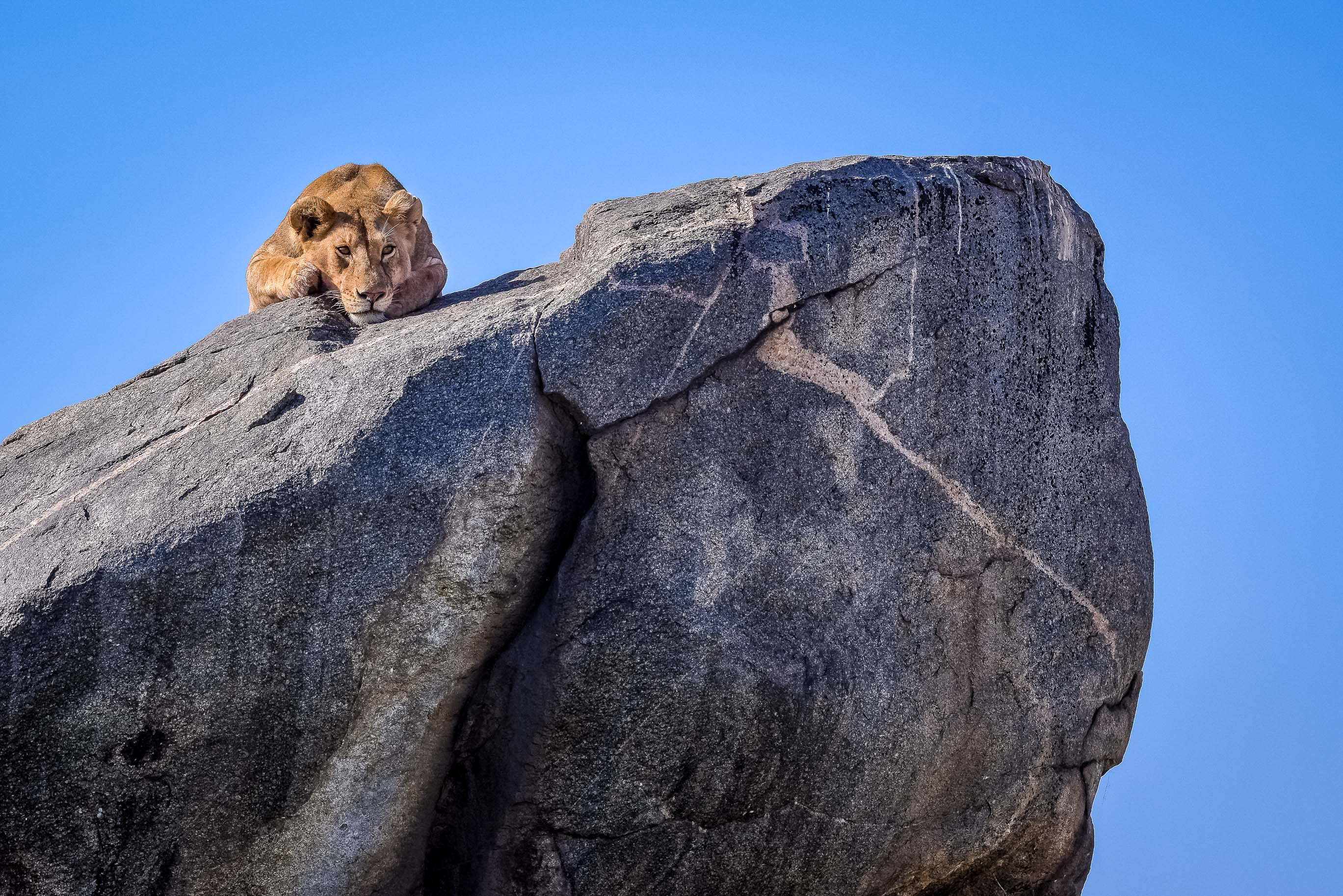
Lion atop a koppie in the Serengeti, northern Tanzania

Inselbergs harbor unique and often endemic species from many taxonomic groups and can serve as refugia for animal species living in the surrounding matrix. Plant communities in these ecosystems are often adapted to extreme conditions such as high solar radiation and water scarcity due to the shallow and rocky soils. Since these species have a restricted distribution, they may also become severely threatened by invasive species.

The inselbergs of Eastern Africa tend to be a refuge for life in the Serengeti of Tanzania and in the Masai Mara of Kenya. Where the soil is too thin or hard to support tree life in large areas, soil trapped by inselbergs can be dense with trees while the surrounding land contains only short grass. Hollows in the rock surfaces provide catchments for rainwater. Many animals have adapted to the use of inselbergs, including the lion, the hyrax, and an abundance of bird and reptile life.

On many tropical inselbergs, bare granite and gneiss surfaces are densely colonised by cyanobacteria and cyanobacterial lichens, which form dark biofilms and crusts that can be more conspicuous than vascular plants at ground level; a study in the Ivory Coast recorded 23 cyanobacterial species from 10 genera and 17 cyanobacterial lichen species from six genera on exposed rock across savanna, transitional and rainforest zones, with several Peltula species forming extensive brown crusts. In drier savanna regions with a several-month dry season, Peltula lichens reach their greatest abundance and species richness and largely cover the rock, whereas towards more humid savanna and rainforest climates the number of lichen species decreases and filamentous and sheathed cyanobacteria such as Scytonema, Stigonema and Gloeocapsa become dominant, producing a black patina on the rock; these poikilohydric organisms tolerate prolonged desiccation and resume photosynthesis only when liquid water is present on the surface. Cyanobacteria and cyanobacterial lichens promote physical and chemical weathering (including surface alkalisation) and generate loose mineral material that accumulates with dead thalli around the base of the outcrops, and measurements on inselberg–savanna transects in tropical South America have shown higher nitrogen concentrations in topsoils adjacent to inselbergs than in the surrounding savanna, consistent with nitrogen fixation by the rock-dwelling cyanobacteria and with the relatively luxuriant growth of trees and shrubs in the immediate vicinity of some inselbergs.

== Gallery ==
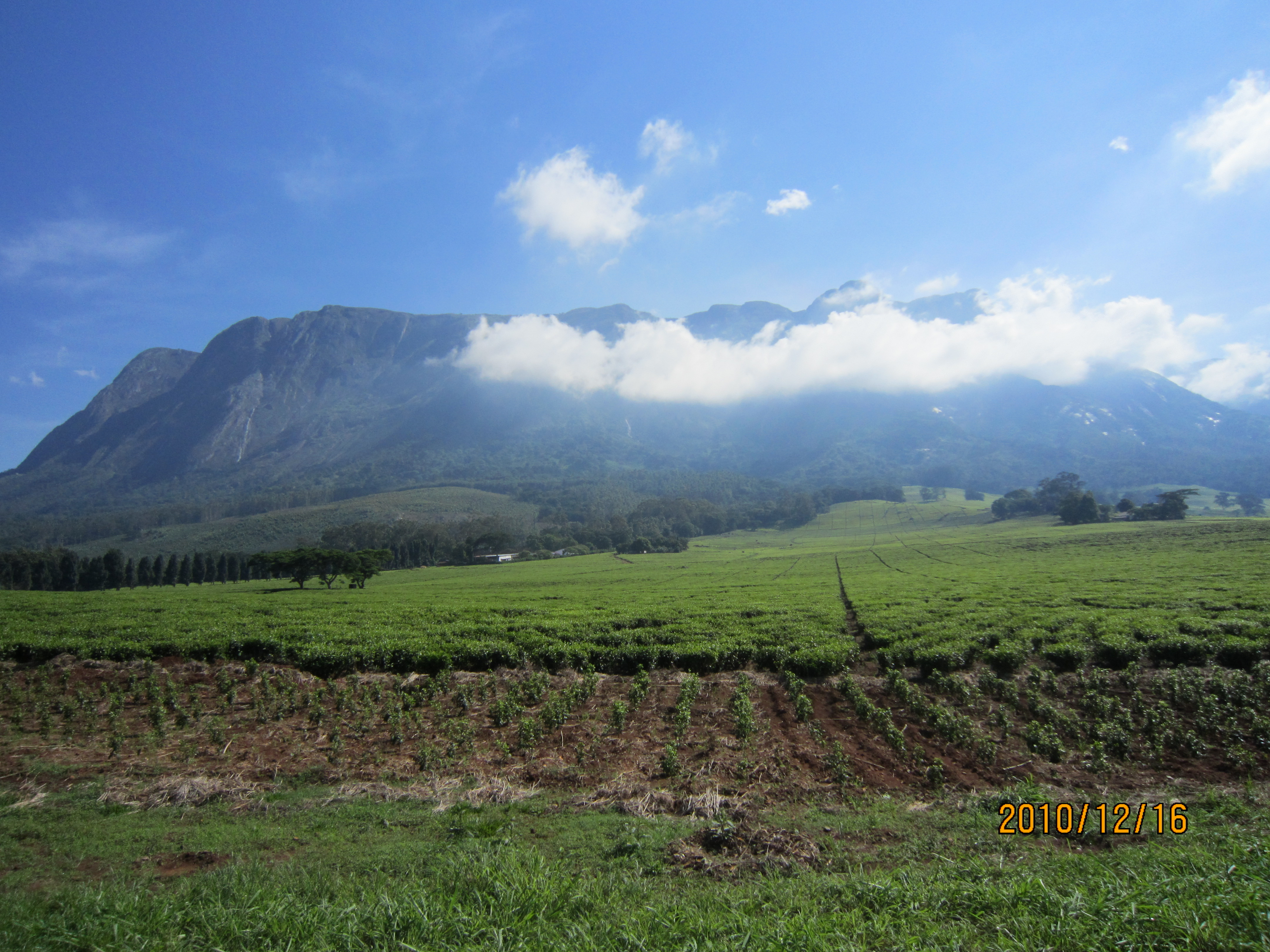
Mount Mulanje, a large inselberg in southeastern Malawi

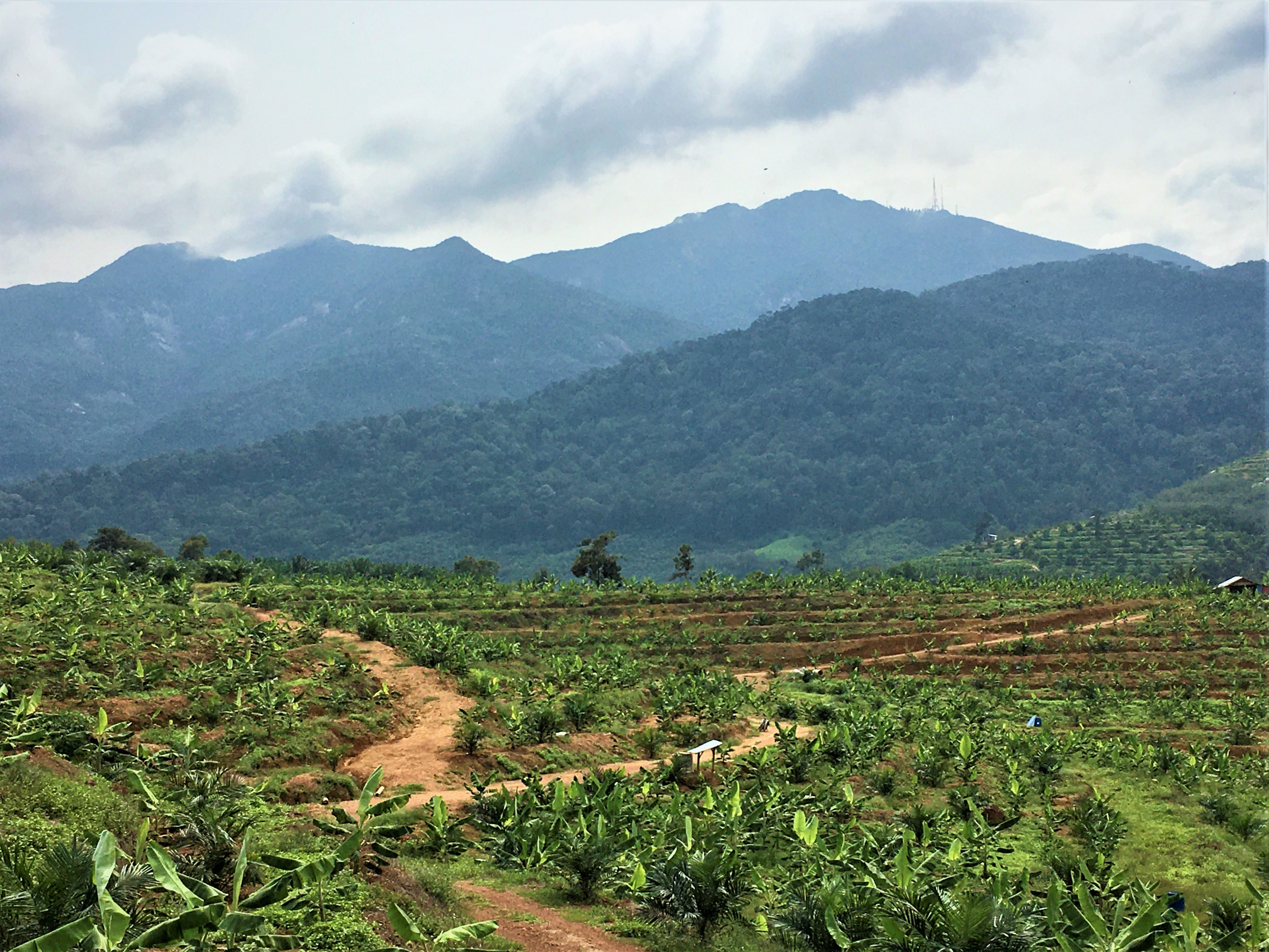
Mount Ledang, a large inselberg in the state of Johor, Malaysia

Mount Banang, a small inselberg in the state of Johor, Malaysia

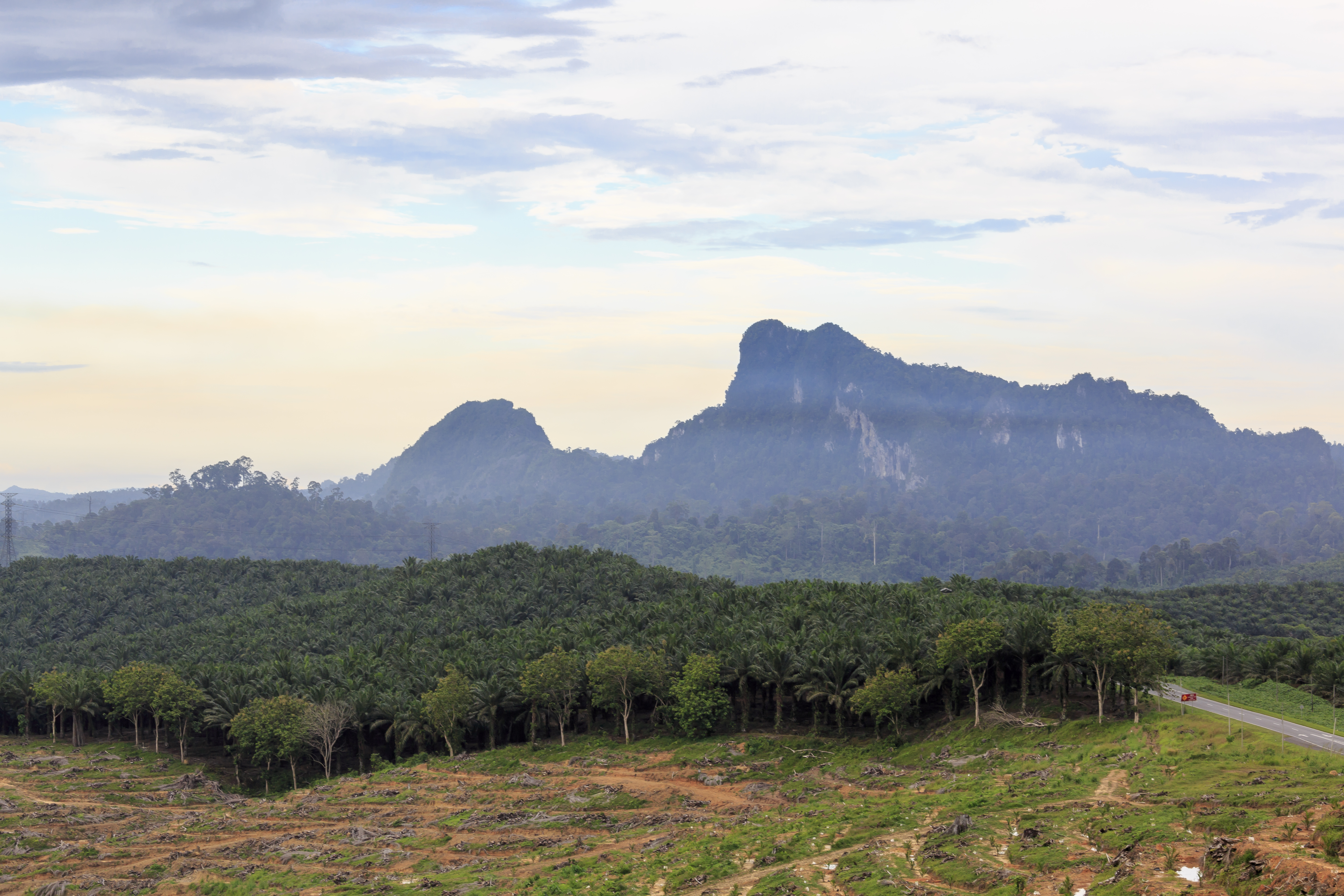
Mount Madai, Sabah, Malaysia

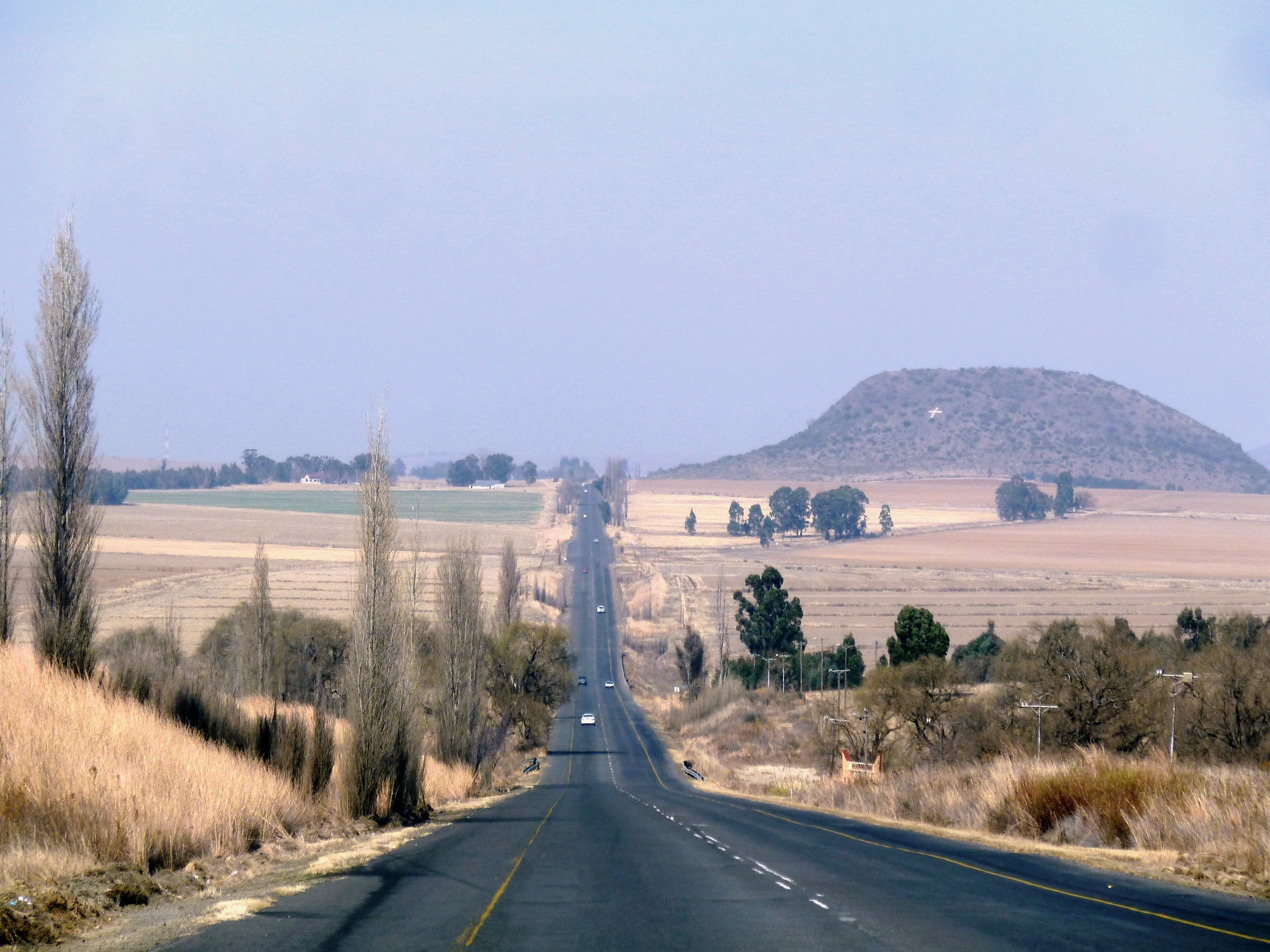
Houtkop, a 170-metre (560 ft) outcrop of Drakensberg basalt in the Free State, South Africa

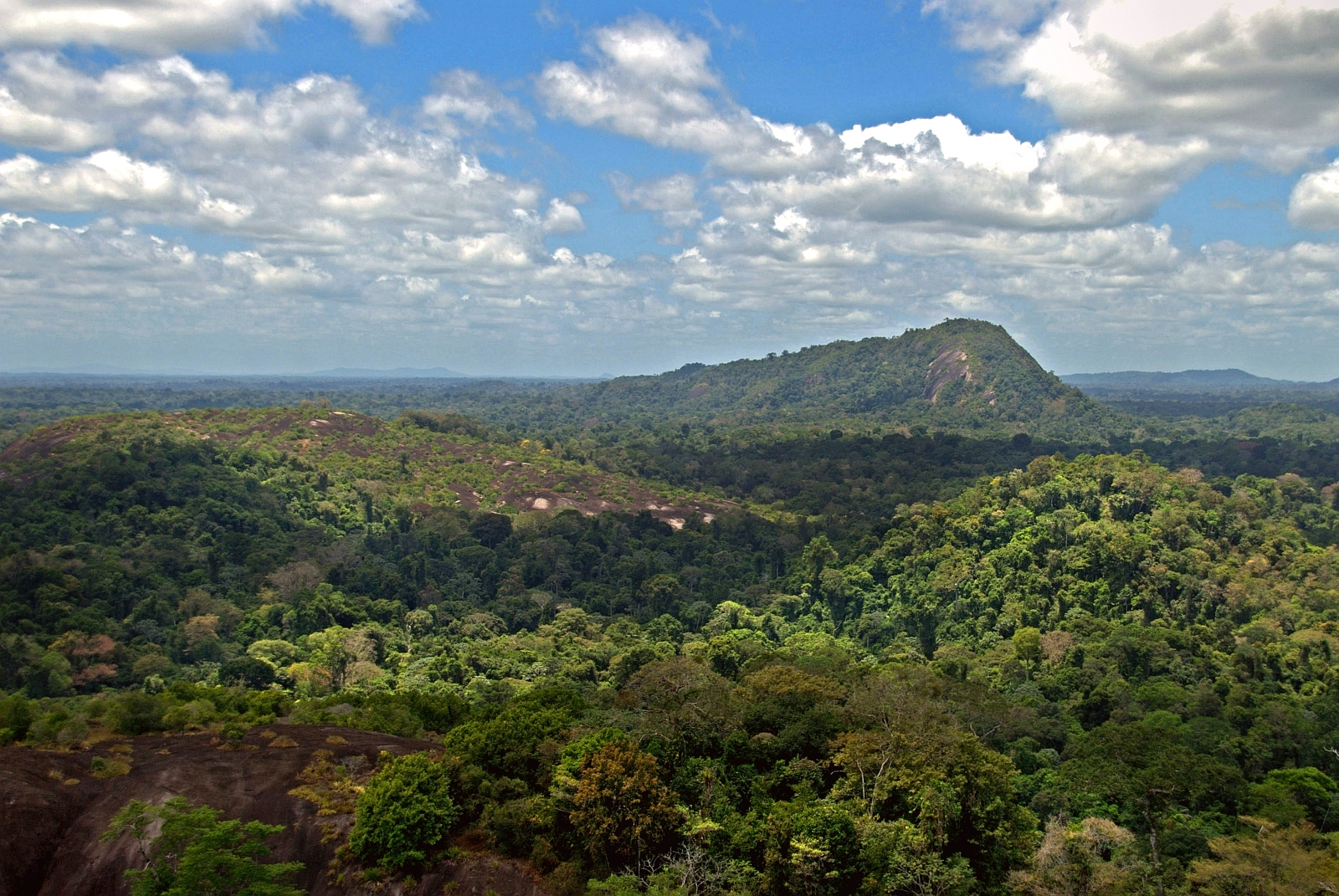
An inselberg in the rainforest of Suriname

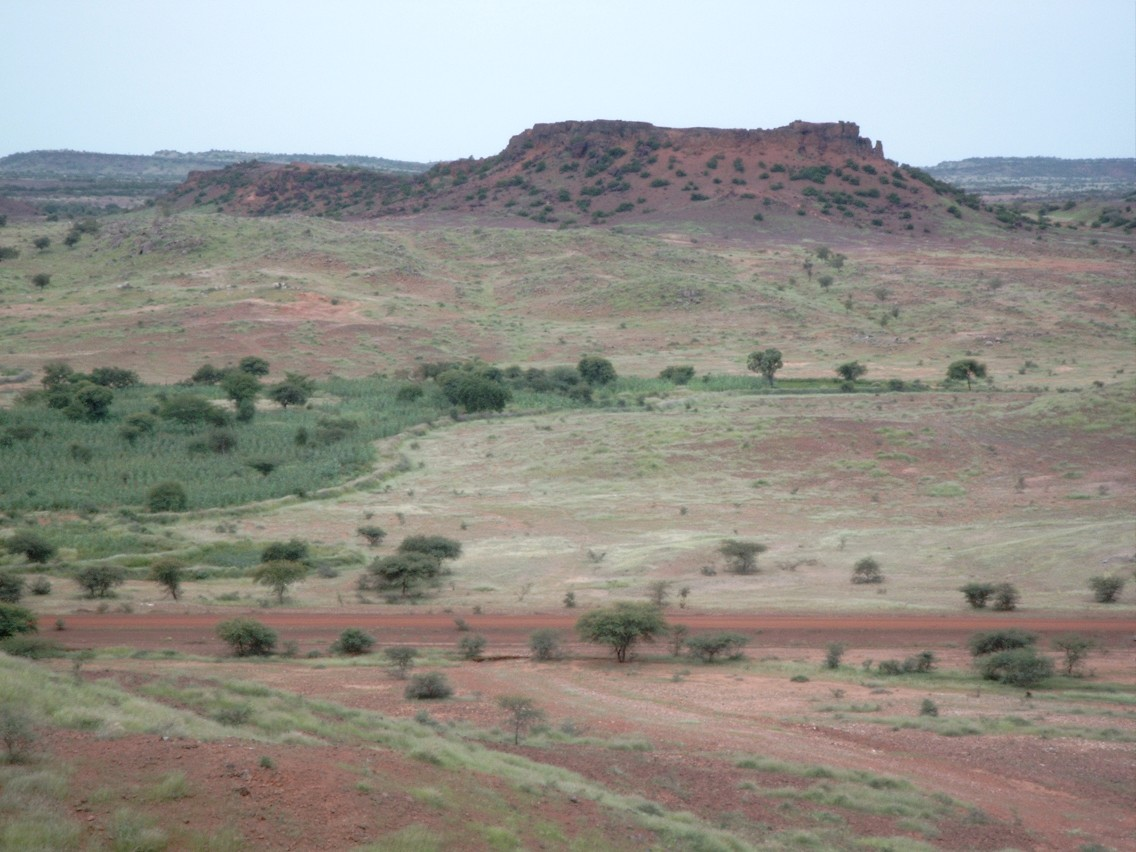
A duricrust inselberg near Dori, Burkina Faso

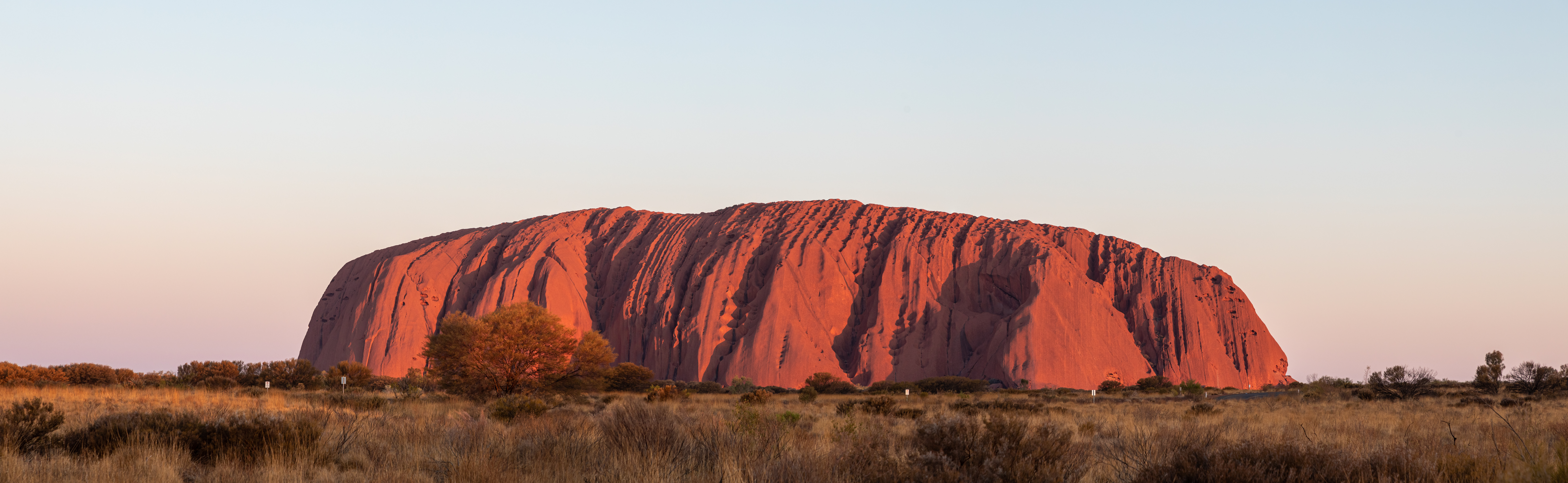
Uluru, an 863-metre (2,831 ft) sandstone formation in Australia's Northern Territory

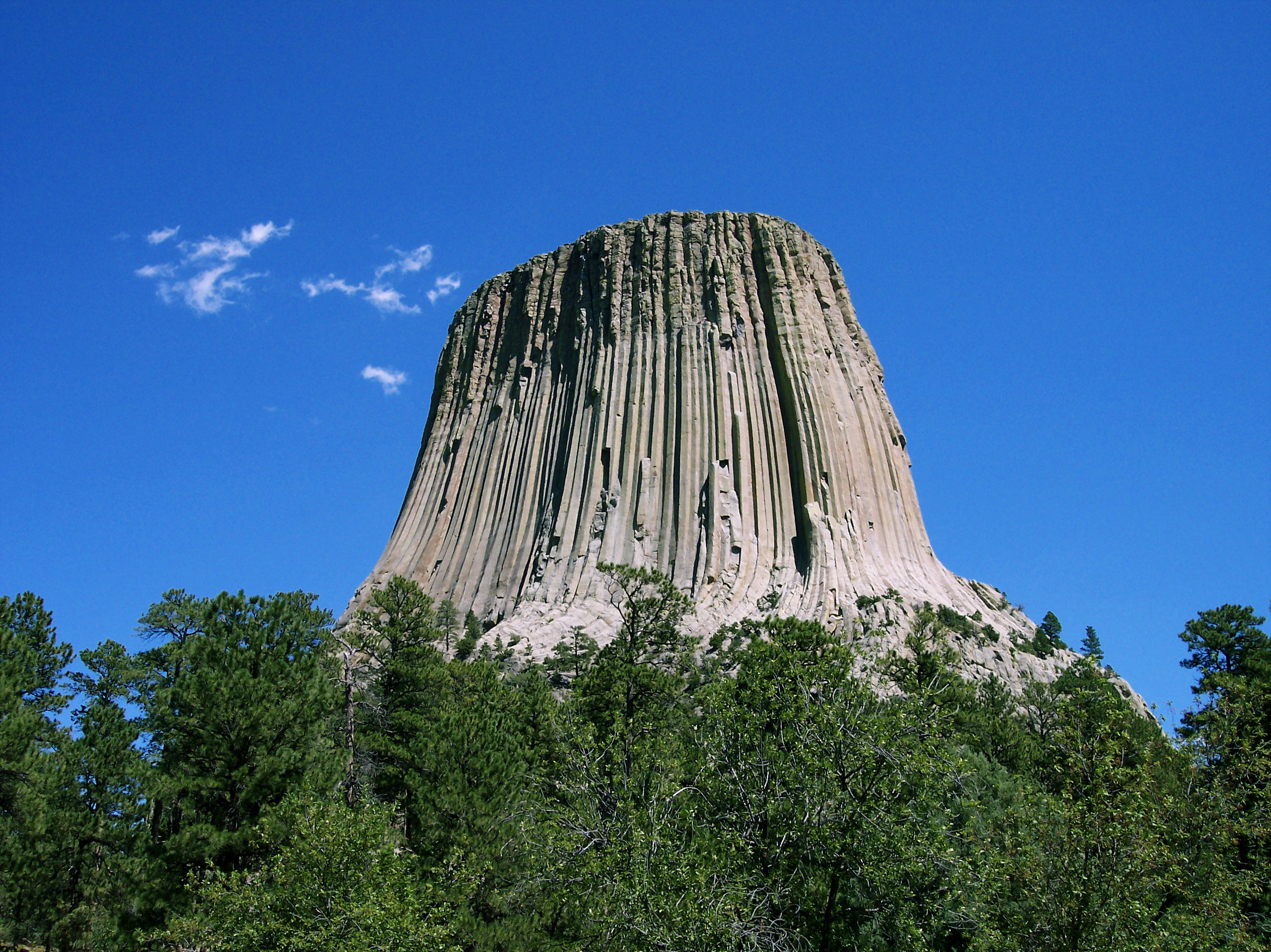
Devils Tower, an archetypal example of an inselberg in Wyoming, US

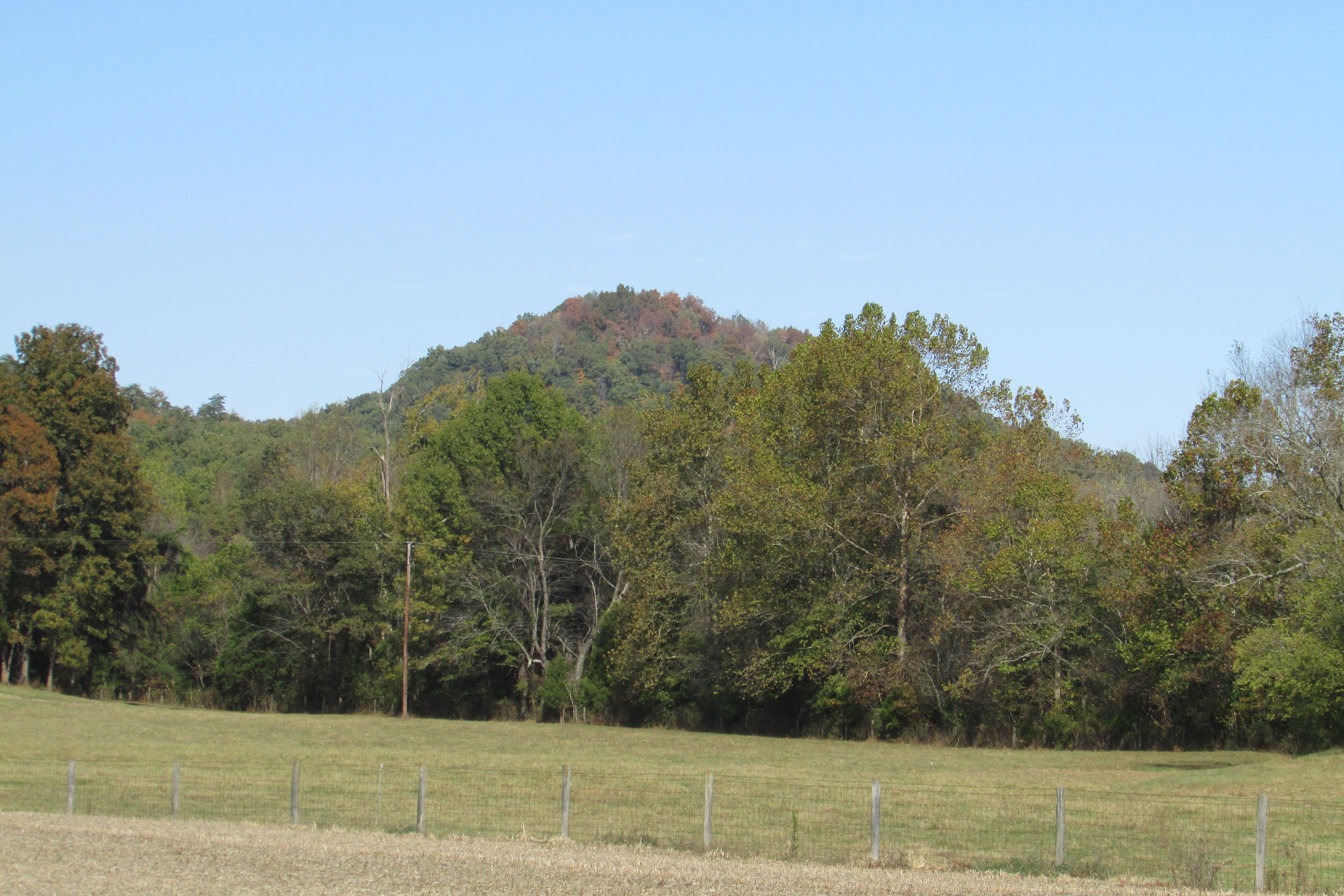
Vinyard Knob (high point 960') in the central portion of the Knobs Region of Kentucky

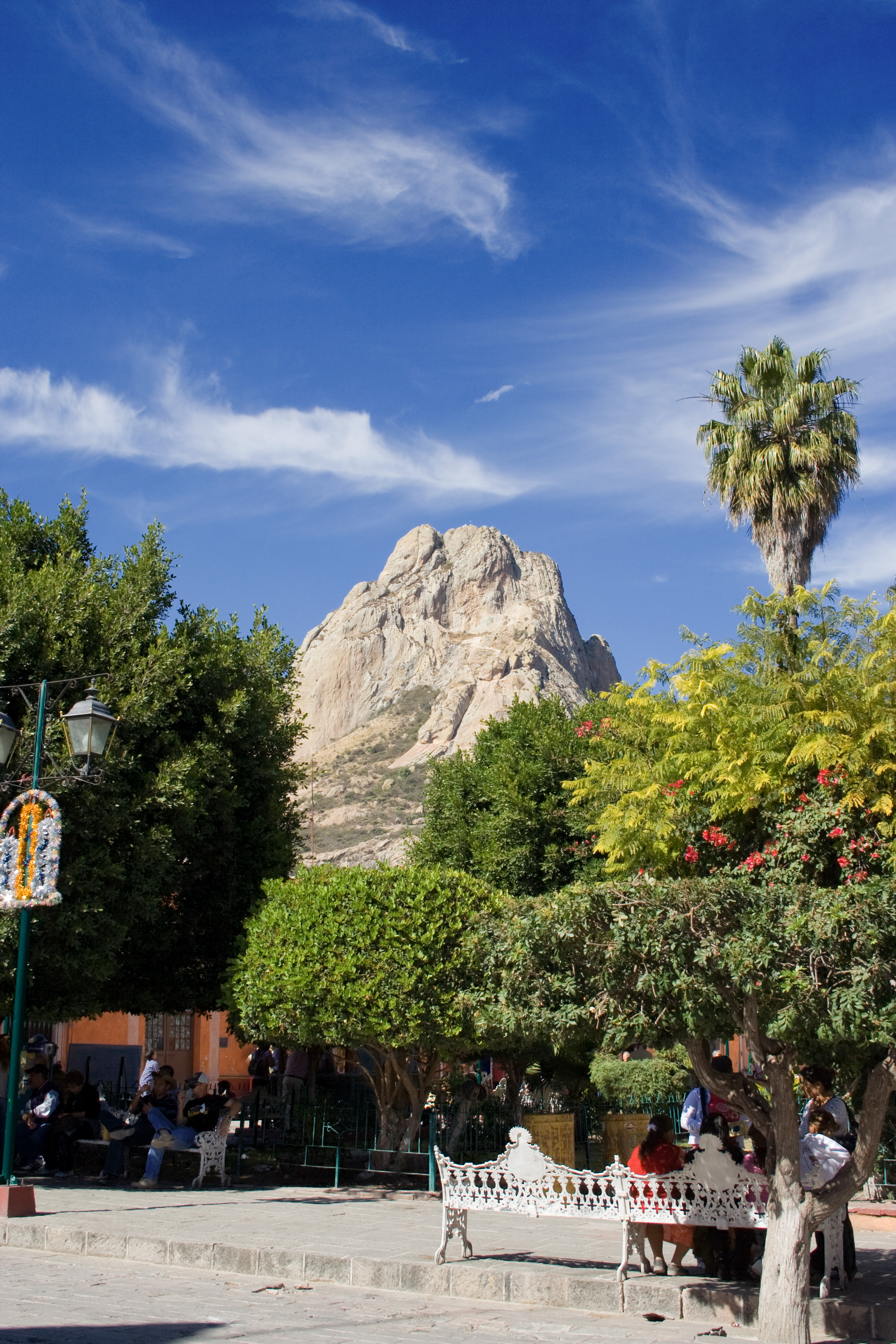
Peña de Bernal in Bernal, Querétaro, México

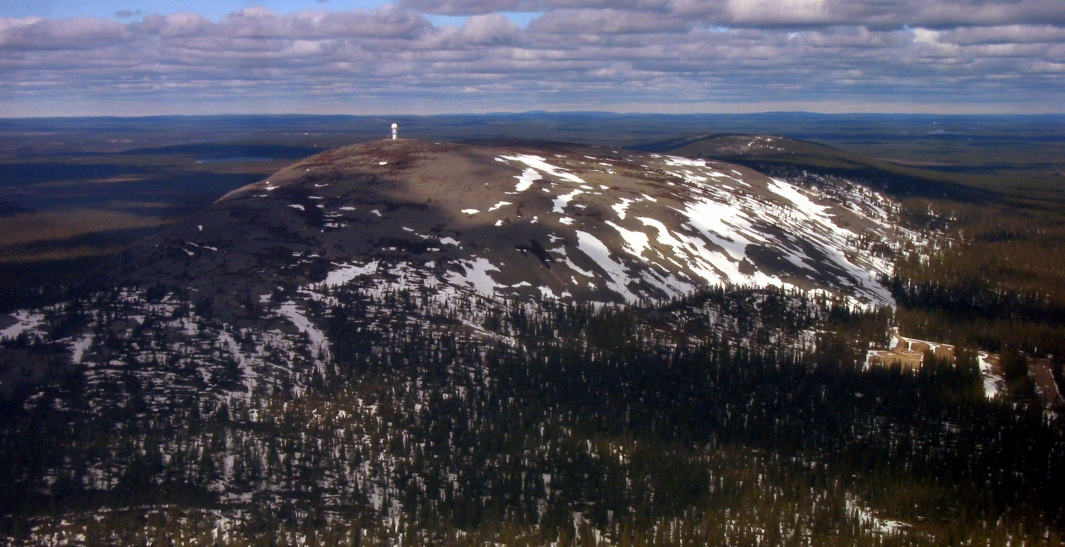
Luosto, Lapland, Finland

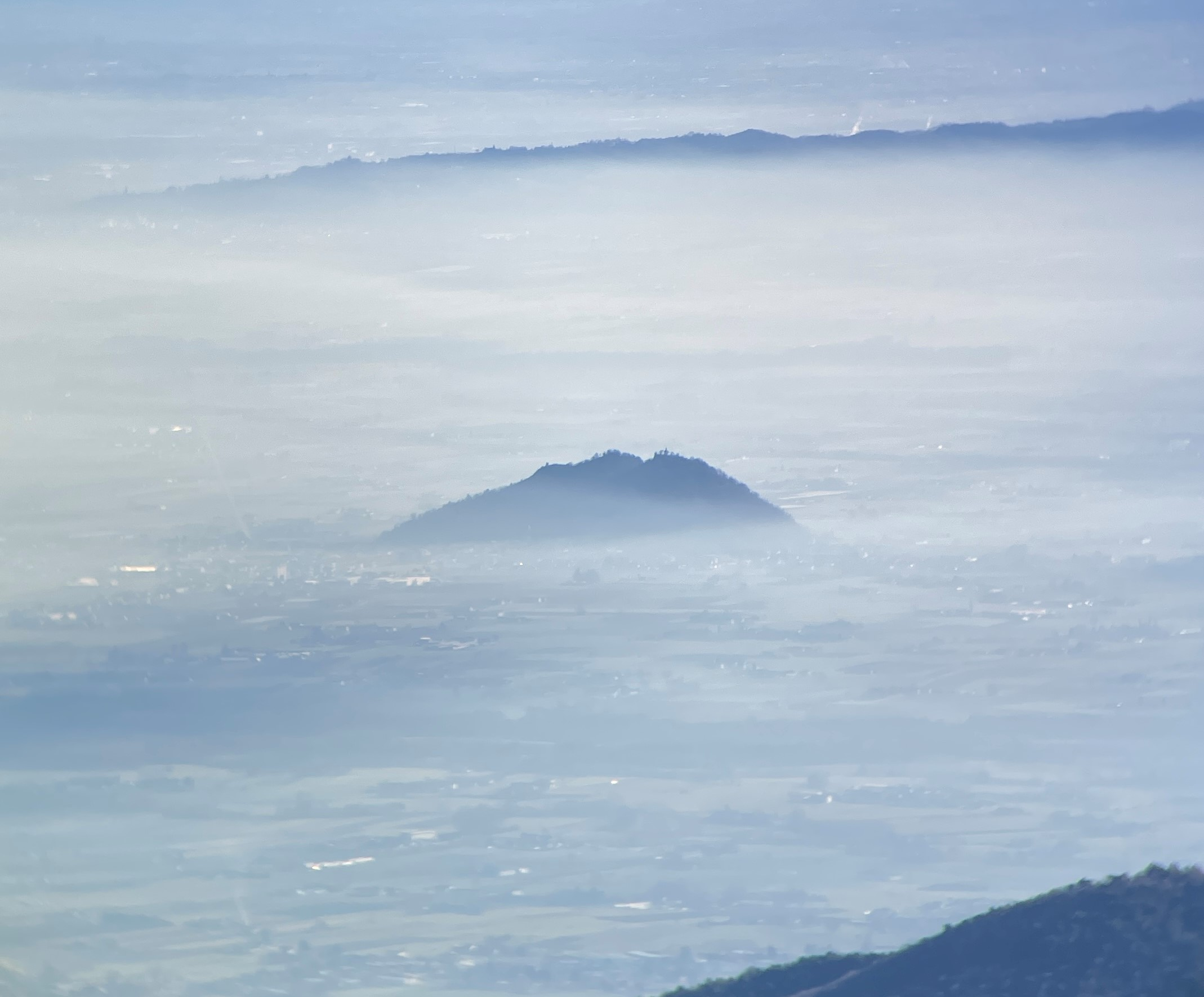
Rocca di Cavour, Piedmont, Italy

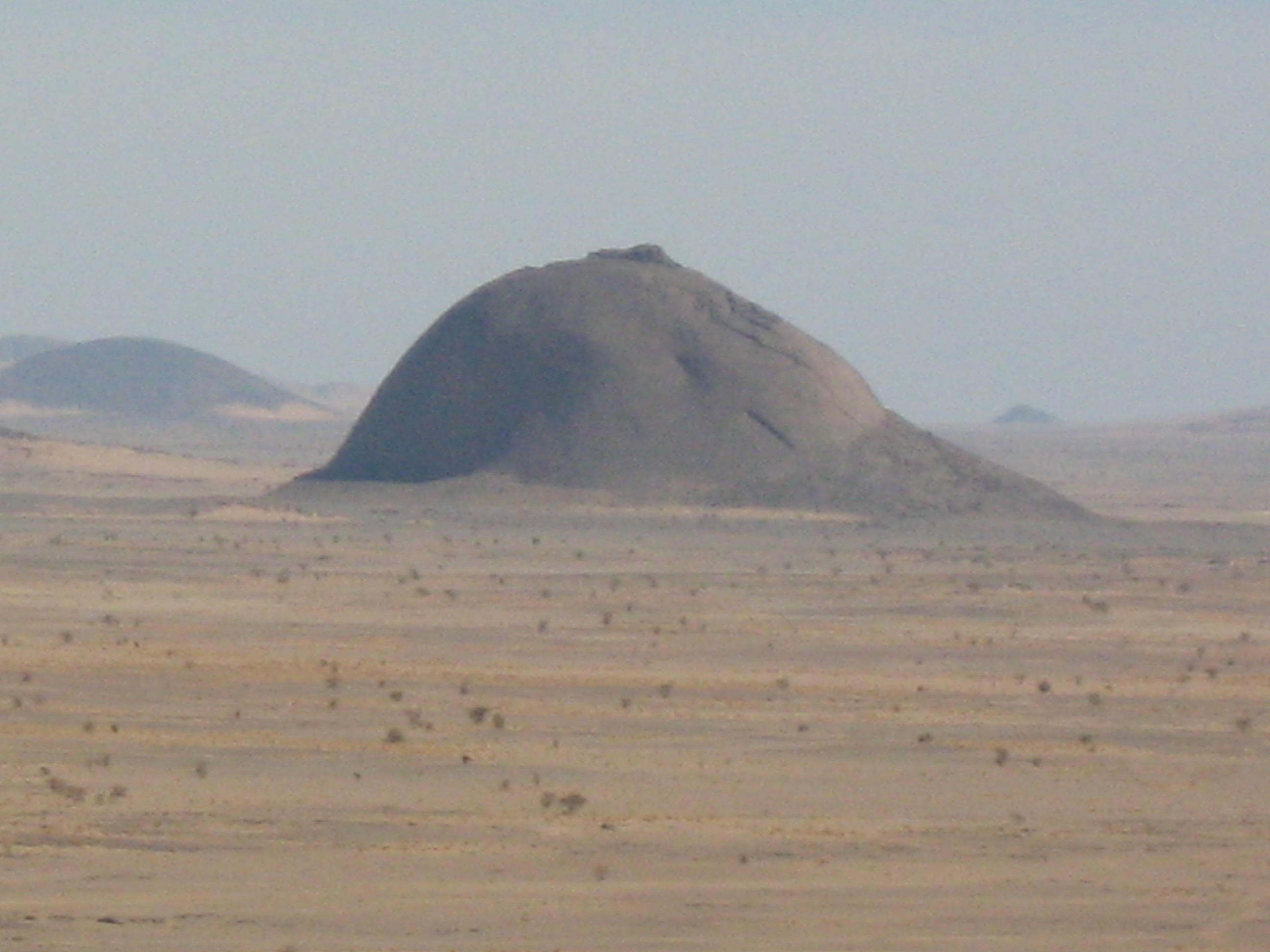
An inselberg in Morocco

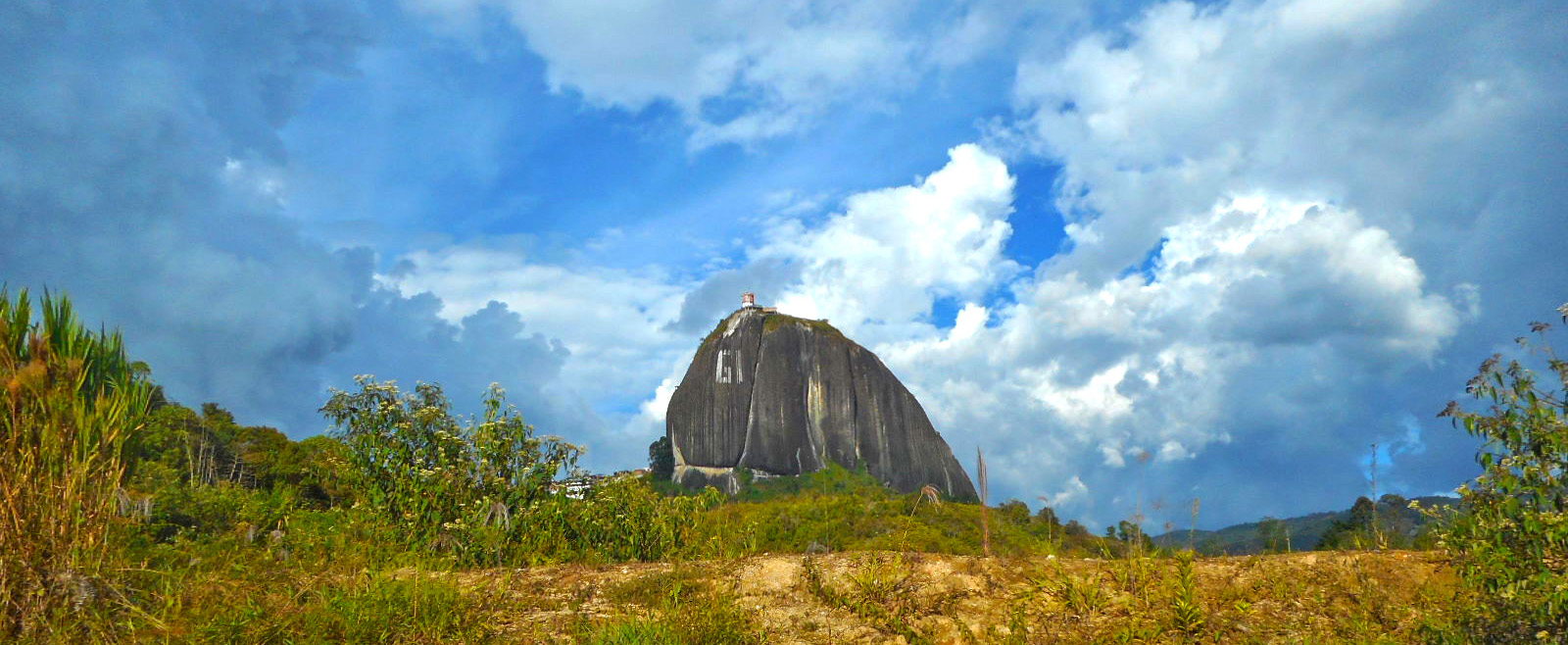
Peñón de Guatapé, Antioquia Department, Colombia

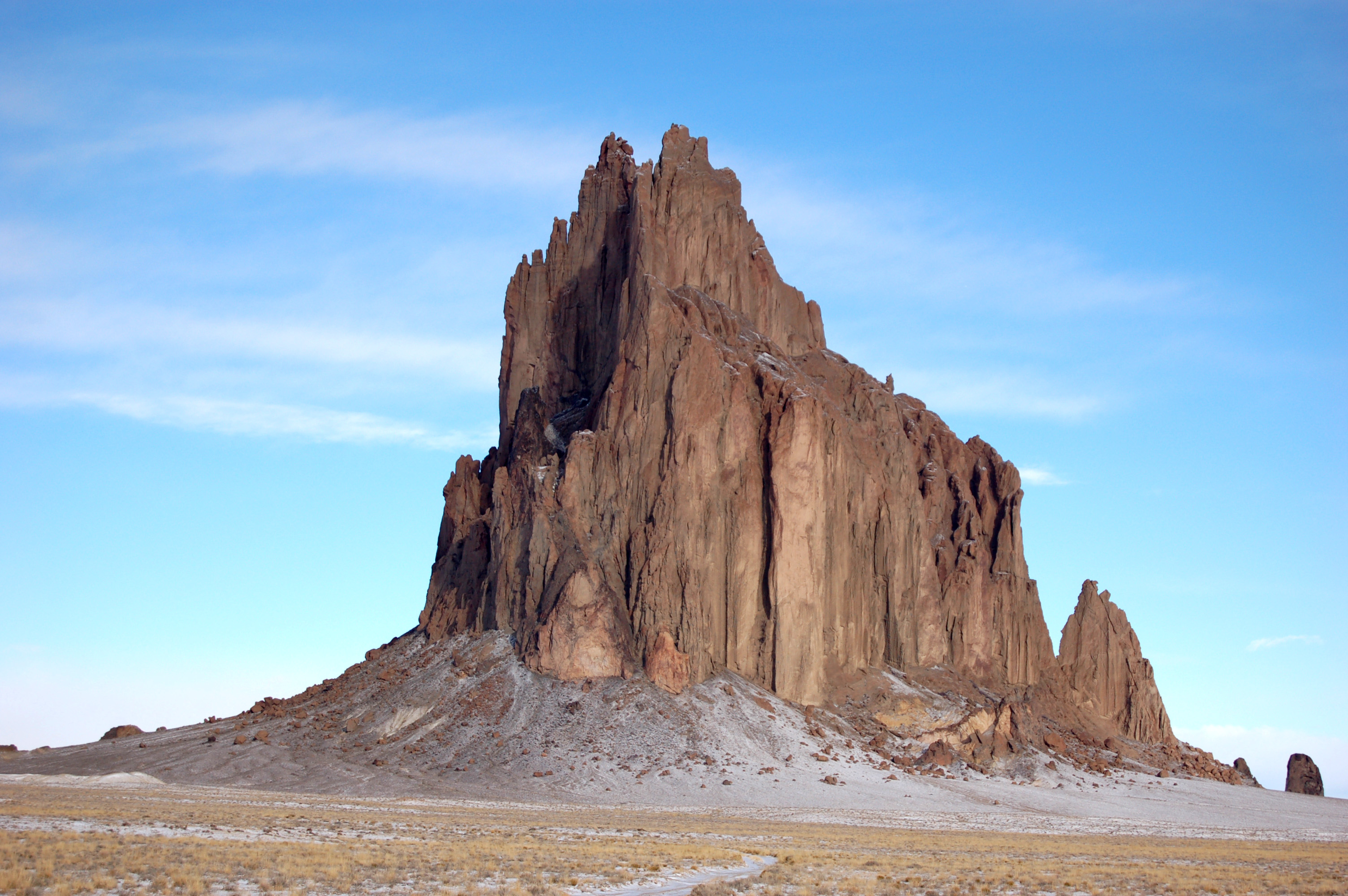
Shiprock, New Mexico

== See also ==
- Bornhardt – Large, dome-shaped, steep-sided, bald rock
- Caprock – Rock overlying a less resistant type
- Dissected plateau – Plateaus area that has been severely eroded so that the relief is sharp
- List of inselbergs
- Mesa – Elevated area of land with a flat top and sides, usually much wider than buttes
- Mogote – Steep-sided residual hill of limestone, marble, or dolomite on a flat plain
- Sky island – Geographic or environmental feature
- Table (landform) – Raised landform with a flat top
- Tuya – Flat-topped, steep-sided volcano
