= Lufingo =

Ward in Mbeya, Tanzania

- Ward
- Location within Tanzania
- Coordinates: 9°16′S 33°35′E
- Country: Tanzania
- Region: Mbeya Region
- District: Rungwe District
- Ward: Lufingo

Government
  - Type: Council

Population (2016)
  - Total: 12,286
- Time zone: UTC+3 (EAT)
- Postcode: 53514
- Area code: 025
- Website: District Website

Lufingo is an administrative ward in the Rungwe district of the Mbeya Region of Tanzania.

In 2016 the Tanzania National Bureau of Statistics report there were 12,286 people in the ward, from 17,166 in 2012 before it was split up.

== Villages and hamlets ==
The ward has 4 villages, and 22 hamlets.

- Itete
  - Bujonde
  - Itete
  - Kasanda
  - Lufingo
  - Mbanganyigale
- Kagwina
  - Kandete
  - Lumbila
  - Masebe
  - Soweto
  - kagwina
- Kalalo
  - Bujinga
  - Busango
  - Igembe
  - Kalalo
  - Katumba
- Simike
  - Ibabu
  - Ipyana
  - Itebe
  - Kakuyu
  - Kasanga
  - Majombo
  - Malibila
