= Bagamoyo Ward =

Ward Mbeya, Tanzania

Bagamoyo
- Ward
- Location within Tanzania
- Coordinates: 9.478°S 33.182°E
- Country: Tanzania
- Region: Mbeya Region
- District: Rungwe District
- Ward: Bagamoyo

Government
  - Type: Council
  - District Executive Director: Loema Peter Isaya
  - MP: Saul Henry Amon
  - Chairman: Ezekiel Mwakota
  - Councilor: Zakayo Yohana Ligate

Population (2016)
  - Total: 3,534
- Time zone: UTC+3 (EAT)
- Postcode: 53502
- Area code: 025
- Website: District Website

Isongole is an administrative ward in Rungwe District, Mbeya Region, Tanzania. In 2016 the Tanzania National Bureau of Statistics report there were 3,534 people in the ward, from 3,207 in 2012.

== Neighborhoods ==
The ward has four neighborhoods:

- Mpindo
- Bulyaga Juu
- Bulyaga Kati
- Igamba
