= Itagata =

Ward in Mbeya, Tanzania

- Ward
- Location within Tanzania
- Coordinates: 9.478°S 33.182°E
- Country: Tanzania
- Region: Mbeya Region
- District: Rungwe District
- Ward: Itagata

Government
  - Type: Council

Population (2016)
  - Total: 1,002
- Time zone: UTC+3 (EAT)
- Area code: 025
- Website: District Website

Itagata is an administrative ward in Rungwe District, Mbeya Region, Tanzania. In 2016 the Tanzania National Bureau of Statistics report there were 1,002 people in the ward. The ward has 2 neighborhoods; Itagata, and Ikama.
