= Msasani Ward =

Place in Rungwe District

Msasani Kata ya Msasani
- Ward
- Location within Tanzania
- Coordinates: 9.2844514°S 33.654421°E
- Country: Tanzania
- Region: Mbeya Region
- District: Rungwe District
- Ward: Msasani

Government
  - District Executive Director: Loema Peter Isaya
  - MP: Saul Henry Amon
  - Chairman: Ezekiel Mwakota
  - Councilor: Alipipi Mwambafula Makotole

Population (2016)
  - Total: 6,935
- Time zone: UTC+3 (EAT)

Msasani is an administrative ward in the Rungwe District of the Mbeya Region of Tanzania. In 2016 the Tanzania National Bureau of Statistics report there were 6,935 people in the ward, from 6,292 in 2012.
