= Kinyala =

Administrative ward in Mbeya Tanzania

Kinyala Kata ya Kinyala
- Ward
- Location within Tanzania
- Coordinates: 9.102°S 33.481°E
- Country: Tanzania
- Region: Mbeya Region
- District: Rungwe District
- Ward: Kinyala

Population (2016)
  - Total: 14,185
- Time zone: UTC+3 (EAT)
- Postcode: 53535

Kinyala is an administrative ward in the Rungwe District of the Mbeya Region of Tanzania. In 2016 the Tanzania National Bureau of Statistics report there were 14,185 people in the ward, from 12,871 in 2012.

== Villages and hamlets ==
The ward has 6 villages, and 40 hamlets.

- Igembe
  - Igembe
  - Ikuti A
  - Ikuti B
  - Kipili
  - Songwe
  - katumba
- Isumba
  - Igembe
  - Isumba
  - Itebe
  - Kibole
  - Kikuyu
- Kipande
  - Chunya
  - Igwila
  - Ilala
  - Kilambo
  - Kipande
  - Mbeswe
- Kisoko
  - Ilunga
  - Kisoko
  - Mete
  - Ngeke
  - Njole
  - Salima
- Lubigi
  - Ikukisya
  - Itete
  - Kakindo
  - Lubigi
  - Magamba
  - Mbegele
  - Moto
- Lukata
  - Ikoga
  - Ipugu
  - Itete
  - Katumba
  - Kibanja
  - Lubala
  - Mpombo
  - Ndola
  - Ngologo
  - Nkebe
