= Masukulu =

Coordinates: 9°24′S 33°45′E

Masukulu Ward
- Administrative ward
- Interactive map of Masukulu Ward
- Country: Tanzania
- Region: Mbeya
- District: Rungwe
- Leadership: legislature

Government
  - Type: District Council
  - District Executive Director: Loema Peter Isaya
  - MP: Saul Henry Amon
  - Chairman: Ezekiel Mwakota
  - Councilor: Winston Mwaigwisa Mwansasu
- Time zone: UTC+03 (Greenwich Mean Time)
  - Summer (DST): UTC+03

Masukulu is an administrative ward in the Rungwe district of the Mbeya Region of Tanzania. According to the 2002 census, the ward has a total population of 9,516.
