= Mpuguso =

Coordinates: 9°19′S 33°39′E

Mpuguso Ward
- Interactive map of Mpuguso Ward
- Country: Tanzania
- Region: Mbeya
- District: Rungwe
- Leadership: legislature

Government
  - Type: District Council
  - District Executive Director: Loema Peter Isaya
  - MP: Antony Mwantona
  - Chairman: Ezekiel Mwakota
  - Councilor: Gerald Ernest Bakize
- Time zone: UTC+03 (Greenwich Mean Time)
  - Summer (DST): UTC+03

Mpuguso is an administrative ward in the Rungwe district of the Mbeya Region of Tanzania. According to the 2002 census, the ward has a total population of 12,223.
