= Matwebe =

Coordinates: 9.478°S 33.182°E

Matwebe Ward
- Interactive map of Matwebe Ward
- Country: Tanzania
- Region: Mbeya
- District: Rungwe
- Leadership: legislature

Government
  - Type: District Council
  - District Executive Director: Loema Peter Isaya
  - MP: Saul Henry Amon
  - Chairman: Ezekiel Mwakota
  - Councilor: Samuel January Mwakasege
- Time zone: UTC+03 (Greenwich Mean Time)
  - Summer (DST): UTC+03

Matwebe is an administrative ward in Rungwe District, Mbeya Region, Tanzania. As of 2022, the ward had a total population of 2859.
