= Ibighi =

Ibighi Kata ya Ibighi
- Ward
- Location within Tanzania Location within Africa
- Coordinates: 9.478°S 33.182°E
- Country: Tanzania
- Region: Mbeya Region
- District: Rungwe District
- Ward: Ibighi

Government
  - Type: District Council
  - Director: Loema Peter Isaya
  - MP: Saul Henry Amon
  - Chairman: Ezekiel Mwakota
  - Councilor: Emanuel Simba Lusubila

Population (2016)
  - Total: 9,808
- Time zone: UTC+3 (EAT)
- Postcode: 53507

Ibighi, also known as Ibigi, is an Ward in Rungwe District, Mbeya Region, Tanzania. In 2016 the Tanzania National Bureau of Statistics report there were 9,808 people in the ward, from 8,899 in 2012.

== Villages ==
The ward has two villages Katumba, and Ilinga.
