= Kisiba =

Ward in Rungwe, Mbeya, Tanzania

Kisiba Kata ya Kisiba
- Ward
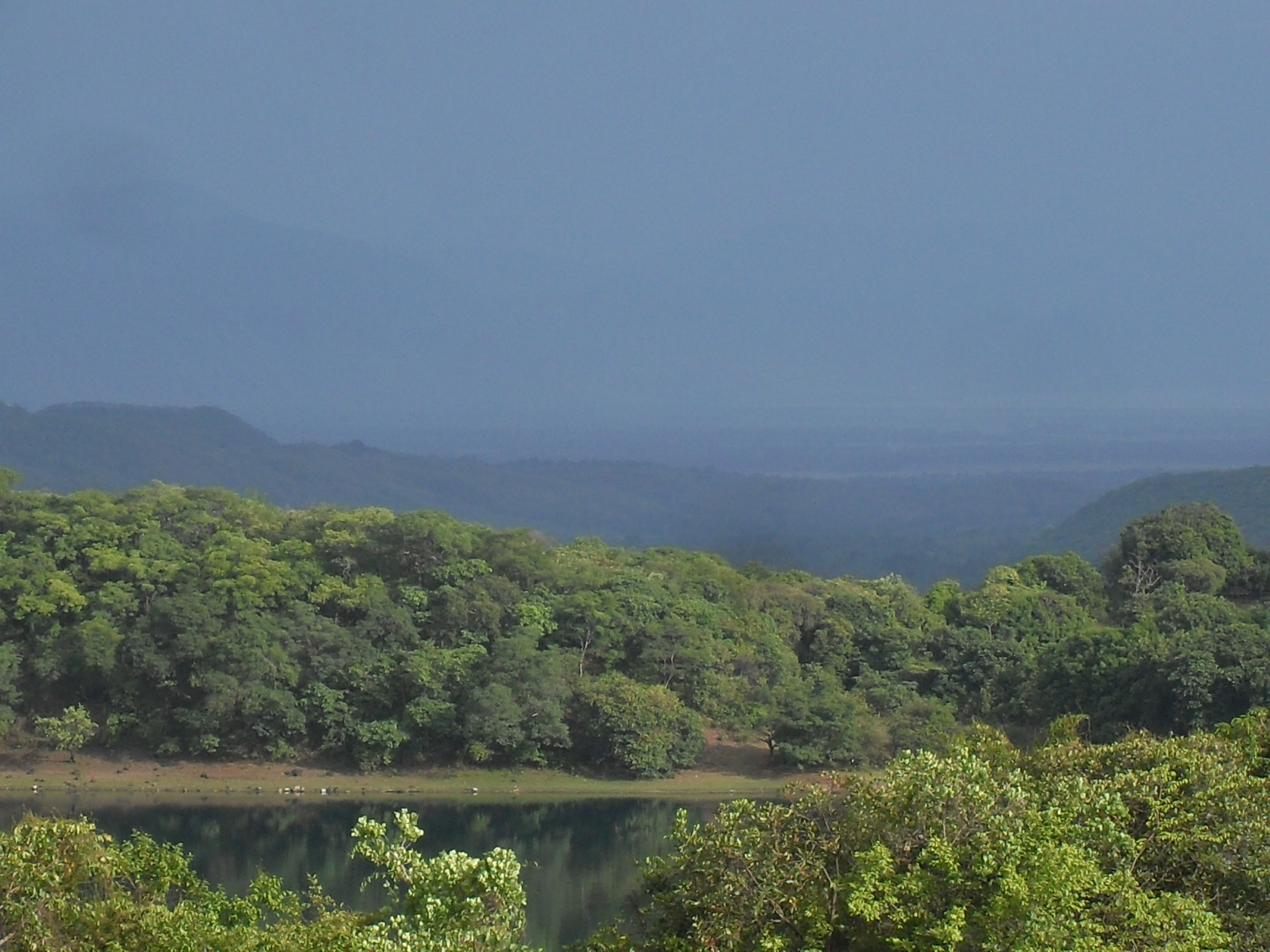
- Kisiba volcanic crater lake

- Location within Tanzania
- Coordinates: 9.332°S 33.748°E
- Country: Tanzania
- Region: Mbeya Region
- District: Rungwe District
- Ward: Kisiba

Population (2016)
  - Total: 7,306
- Time zone: UTC+3 (EAT)
- Postcode: 53522

Kisiba is an administrative ward in the Rungwe district of the Mbeya Region of Tanzania. In 2016 the Tanzania National Bureau of Statistics report there were 7,306 people in the ward, from 6,629 in 2012.

== Villages and hamlets ==
The ward has 4 villages, and 14 hamlets.

- Busisya
  - Busilya
  - Busisya
  - Butumba
- Isabula
  - Ikama
  - Ikomelo
  - Isabula Chini
  - Isabula Juu
  - Iseselo
- Lwifwa
  - Iseselo juu
  - Lugombo
  - Lwifwa
- Mbaka
  - Kibundugulu
  - Landani
  - Mibula
