= Kisondela =

Ward in Rungwe, Mbeya, Tanzania

Kisondela Kata ya Kisondela
- Ward
- Location within Tanzania
- Coordinates: 8.9092742°S 33.45832822°E
- Country: Tanzania
- Region: Mbeya Region
- District: Rungwe District
- Ward: Kisondela

Population (2016)
  - Total: 12,200
- Time zone: UTC+3 (EAT)
- Postcode: 53518

Kisondela is an administrative ward in the Rungwe district of the Mbeya Region of Tanzania. In 2016 the Tanzania National Bureau of Statistics report there were 12,200 people in the ward, from 11,070 in 2012.

== Villages and hamlets ==
The ward has 5 villages, and 26 hamlets.

- Bugoba
  - Bugoba
  - Igembe
  - Lusungo chini
  - Lusungo juu
  - Masebe
- Isuba
  - Ilulwe
  - Iponjola
  - Isuba
  - Seso
  - katumba
- Kibatata
  - Ipyana
  - Kililila
  - Kisondela
  - Lusungo II
  - Mwanjelwa
  - Ndubi Ndubi
- Lutete
  - Bujesi
  - Isumba
  - Lugombo
  - Majengo
  - Ngubati
  - Njela
  - Nnyamisi
- Mpuga
  - Mpuga
  - Ngopyolo
  - Nsyamba
