= Bornhardt =

Large, dome-shaped, steep-sided, bald rock

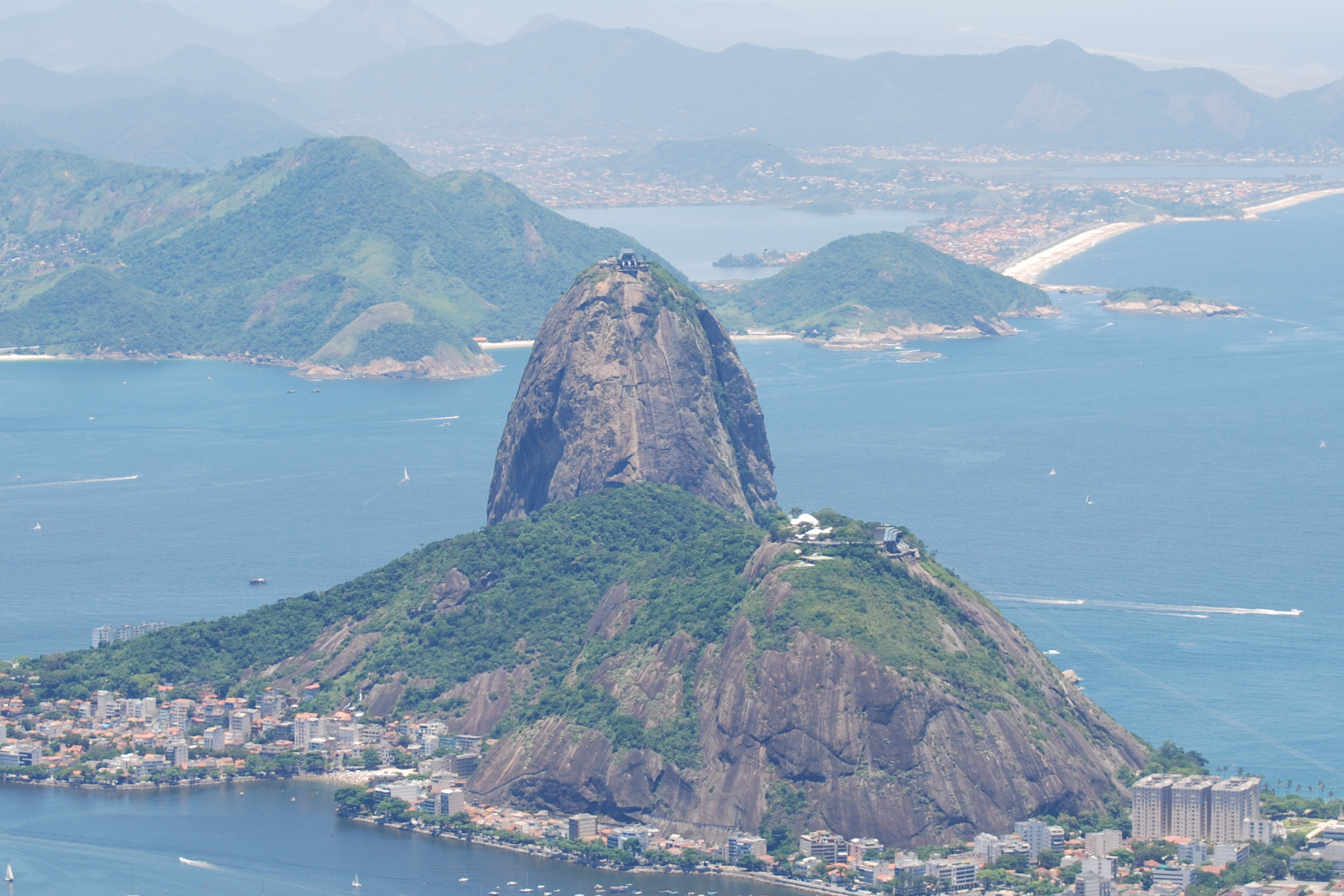
Sugarloaf Mountain, a bornhardt in Rio de Janeiro, Brazil

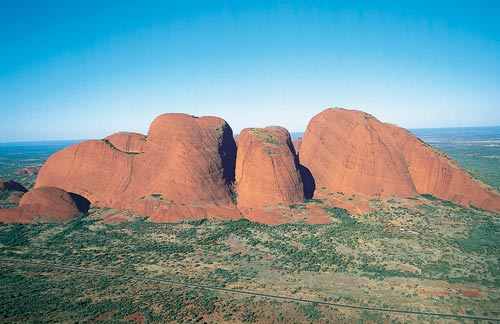
Kata Tjuṯa, in Northern Territory, Australia

A bornhardt ( /ˈbɔːrnˈhɑːrt/) is a dome-shaped, steep-sided, bald rock outcropping at least 30 metres (100 ft) in height and several hundred metres in width. They are named after Wilhelm Bornhardt (1864–1946), a German geologist and explorer of German East Africa, who first described the feature.

While bornhardt was originally used to sometimes denote a type of inselberg (literally island mountain—an isolated dome in an otherwise flat landscape), the term bornhardt is used in modern literature to refer to domed hills and mountains regardless of isolation; thus, not all bornhardts are inselbergs and not all inselbergs are bornhardts. Bornhardts are commonly composed of igneous rocks, often granites, but examples of gneiss, quartzite and arkose bornhardts exist.

The Sugarloaf Mountain of Rio de Janeiro is a typical example of this landform and is the origin of the common bornhardt nickname "sugar loaf".

Bornhardts are most easily seen in arid and semi-arid regions, but occur over a wide range of climates. Bornhardts are found in diverse topographic settings. They mainly occur in Multicyclic landscapes, or landscapes which underwent two or more cycles of erosion. Over geological time, bornhardts may degrade to form other landforms such as nubbins (or knolls) and castle koppies. Bornhardts were previously thought of as characteristically tropical landforms, but have been shown to be more related to lithology and rock structure than climate.

Depending on their shape, they are also referred to as sugar loaves, whalebacks, turtlebacks or domes. In certain locales they may be known as dwalas, half-oranges, matopos, etc. Often, the underlying geological fracture pattern is shown by the surface arrangement of bornhardts, as can be seen in the Kamiesberge of Namaqualand and the Everard Ranges of Central Australia.

Bornhardts commonly show extensive sheet jointing (fracture systems in the rock parallel to its surface). There are two main theories on the origins of bornhardts, each relating to jointing. The exogenetic theory asserts that sheet jointing is formed in response to the emerging topography, while the endogenetic theory suggests that the topography in bornhardts reflects already existing sheet jointing.

== See also ==
- Granite dome – Rounded hills of bare granite formed by exfoliation
- Inselberg – Isolated, steep rock hill on relatively flat terrain
- Monolith – Stone block made of one single piece; object made of one single rock piece
