= Ilima (ward) =

Ward in Mbeya, Tanzania

- Ward
- Location within Tanzania
- Coordinates: 9.478°S 33.182°E
- Country: Tanzania
- Region: Mbeya Region
- District: Rungwe District
- Ward: Ilima

Government
  - Type: Council
  - District Executive Director: Loema Peter Isaya
  - MP: Saul Henry Amon
  - Chairman: Ezekiel Mwakota
  - Councilor: Emanuel Mathew Mwaijande

Population (2016)
  - Total: 7,425
- Time zone: UTC+3 (EAT)
- Postcode: 53519
- Area code: 025
- Website: District Website

Ilima is an administrative ward in Rungwe District, Mbeya Region, Tanzania. In 2016 the Tanzania National Bureau of Statistics report there were 7,425 people in the ward, from 6,737 in 2012.

== Villages and hamlets ==
The ward has 6 villages, and 16 hamlets.

- Ilima
  - Ibolelo
  - Ilima
- Itula
  - Ibolela A
  - Ibolela B
  - Itula A
  - Itula B
- Katundulu
  - Katundulu
  - Lugombo
  - Segela
- Lubanda
  - Kagindwa
  - Lubanda
- Ngujubwaje 'A'
  - Kayuki
  - Lugombo
- Ngujubwaje 'B'
  - Bujesi
  - Landani
  - Ntuso
