= Kiwira =

Ward in Mbeya, Tanzania

- Ward
- Location within Tanzania
- Coordinates: 9°10′S 33°32′E
- Country: Tanzania
- Region: Mbeya Region
- District: Rungwe District
- Ward: Kiwira

Government
  - Type: Council

Population (2016)
  - Total: 27,822
- Time zone: UTC+3 (EAT)
- Postcode: 53515
- Area code: 025
- Website: District Website

Kiwira is an administrative ward in the Rungwe district of the Mbeya Region of Tanzania. In 2016 the Tanzania National Bureau of Statistics report there were 27,822 people in the ward, from 25,244 in 2012.

== Villages and hamlets ==
The ward has 5 villages, and 28 hamlets.

- Ibula
  - Ibula
  - Kanyegele
  - Katela
  - Kibumbe
  - Sanu - Salala Kalongo
- Ilolo
  - Ibigi
  - Ilolo
  - Itekele
  - Kisungu
  - Masebe
  - Masugwa
- Ilundo
  - Bujinga
  - Buswema
  - Ibagha A
  - Ibagha B
  - Kanyambala
  - Lusungo
- Kikota
  - Ilamba
  - Ipande
  - Kang'eng'e
  - Kikota
  - Lubwe
  - Lukwego
- Mpandapanda
  - Ilongoboto
  - Ipoma
  - Isange
  - Kiwira kati
  - Mpandapanda
