= 好美 =

好美, meaning so beautiful, may refer to:

- Haomei (好美里), urban village in Budai, Chiayi
- Konomi, Japanese feminine given name
- Yoshimi, Japanese feminine given name

== See also ==
- Beautiful (disambiguation)
- Beautiful Girl (disambiguation)
- Beauty (disambiguation)
- You're Beautiful (disambiguation)
- 真美 (disambiguation)
