= 真美 =

真美 or 眞美, meaning "true, beauty", may refer to:

- Jinmi-dong (진미동, 眞美洞), dong in city of Gumi, North Gyeongsang, South Korea
- Mami (真美), a Japanese feminine given name

== See also ==
- Beautiful (disambiguation)
- Beautiful Girl (disambiguation)
- Beauty (disambiguation)
- Mami (disambiguation)
- You're Beautiful (disambiguation)
- 好美 (disambiguation)
