= Beautiful =

Beautiful, an adjective used to describe things as possessing beauty, may refer to:

== Fashion ==
- Beautiful (fragrance), a 1985 fragrance released by Estée Lauder

== Film and theater ==
- Beautiful (2000 film), an American film directed by Sally Field
- Beautiful (2008 film), a South Korean film directed by Juhn Jai-hong
- Beautiful (2009 film), an Australian film directed by Dean O'Flaherty
- Beautiful (2011 film), an Indian Malayalam-language film directed by V. K. Prakash
- Beautiful: The Carole King Musical, a 2014 Broadway musical

== Music ==
- The Beautiful (band), an American rock band 1988–1993

=== Albums ===
- Beautiful (Candido Camero album) or the title song, 1970
- Beautiful!, by Charles McPherson, 1975
- Beautiful (David Tao album), 2006
- Beautiful (Fantastic Plastic Machine album), 2001
- Beautiful (Fish Leong album), 2003
- Beautiful (Jessica Mauboy album) or the title song (see below), 2013
- Beautiful (Meg album) or the title song, 2009
- Beautiful (The Reels album), 1982
- Beautiful (Teena Marie album) or the title song, 2013
- Beautiful (Vivian Green album) or the title song, 2010
- Beautiful: The Remix Album, by Blondie, 1995
- Beautiful: A Tribute to Gordon Lightfoot, a Gordon Lightfoot tribute album, 2003
- The Beautiful (album), by Triptych Myth, 2005
- Beautiful (EP), by Amber, or the title song, 2015

=== Songs ===
- "Beautiful" (10 Years song), 2008
- "Beautiful" (2PM song), 2012
- "Beautiful" (A. G. Cook song), 2014
- "Beautiful" (Akon song), 2009
- "Beautiful" (Bazzi song), 2017
- "Beautiful" (Carole King song), 1971
- "Beautiful" (Christina Aguilera song), 2002
- "Beautiful" (Disco Montego song), 2002
- "Beautiful" (Eminem song), 2009
- "Beautiful" (Enrique Iglesias and Kylie Minogue song), 2014
- "Beautiful" (Gordon Lightfoot song), 1972
- "Beautiful" (Ivy song), 1995
- "Beautiful" (Jessica Mauboy song), 2013
- "Beautiful" (Joydrop song), 1998
- "Beautiful" (Lynsey de Paul song), 1977
- "Beautiful" (Mai Kuraki song), 2009
- "#Beautiful" (Mariah Carey song), 2013
- "Beautiful" (MercyMe song), 2010
- "Beautiful" (Miliyah Kato song), 2004
- "Beautiful" (Moby song), 2005
- "Beautiful" (NCT song), 2021
- "Beautiful" (Park Jung-min song), 2012
- "Beautiful" (Sarah De Bono song), 2012
- "Beautiful" (Snoop Dogg song), 2003
- "Beautiful" (Taylor Dayne song), 2007
- "Beautiful" (Treasure song), 2021
- "Beautiful" (Wanna One song), 2017
- "Beautiful", by Aerosmith from Music from Another Dimension!, 2012
- "Beautiful", by Apocalyptica from 7th Symphony, 2010
- "Beautiful", by Athlete from Vehicles & Animals, 2003
- "Beautiful", by Audio Adrenaline from Lift, 2001
- "Beautiful", by Barenaked Ladies from Barenaked Ladies Are Men, 2007
- "Beautiful", by Beast from Lights Go On Again, 2010
- "Beautiful", by Bethany Dillon from Bethany Dillon, 2004
- "Beautiful", by Betty Who from The Valley, 2017
- "Beautiful", by Bombay Rockers from Crash and Burn, 2007
- "Beautiful", by Carly Rae Jepsen, with Justin Bieber, from Kiss, 2012
- "Beautiful", by Cavo from Bright Nights Dark Days, 2009
- "Beautiful", by Cherrybelle from Love Is You, 2011
- "Beautiful", by Clean Bandit from What Is Love?, 2018
- "Beautiful", by Crazy Town from Darkhorse, 2002
- "Beautiful", by Creed from Human Clay, 1999
- "Beautiful", by Damian Marley from Welcome to Jamrock, 2005
- "Beautiful", by Dan Bremnes from Where the Light Is, 2015
- "Beautiful", by Doja Cat from Purrr!, 2014
- "Beautiful", by Don Omar from Mas Flow: Los Benjamins, 2006
- "Beautiful", by Erika Jayne from Pretty Mess, 2009
- "Beautiful", by Exo from Exodus, 2015
- "Beautiful", by GFriend from Fallin' Light, 2019
- "Beautiful", by Goldfrapp from Supernature, 2005
- "Beautiful", by Gotthard from Silver, 2017
- "Beautiful", by Gustavo Cerati from Bocanada, 1999
- "Beautiful", by HIM from Deep Shadows and Brilliant Highlights, 2001
- "Beautiful", by Julian Lennon from Everything Changes, 2011
- "Beautiful", by Kygo from Golden Hour, 2020
- "Beautiful", by Lana Del Rey from Blue Banisters, 2021
- "Beautiful", by Lee & Leblanc (with Sook-Yin Lee), from the Shortbus soundtrack, 2006
- "Beautiful", by Mali Music from Mali Is..., 2014
- "Beautiful", by Mandalay from Empathy, 1998
- "Beautiful", by Marillion from Afraid of Sunlight, 1995
- "Beautiful", by Matt Darey, 2002
- "Beautiful", by Michelle Williams from Journey to Freedom, 2014
- "Beautiful", by Moka Only from The Desired Effect, 2005
- "Beautiful", by Monsta X, 2017
- "Beautiful", by Paul Simon from Surprise, 2006
- "Beautiful", by Pop Evil from Onyx, 2013
- "Beautiful", by Rasmus Seebach, 2019
- "Beautiful", by Sevendust from Animosity, 2001
- "Beautiful", by Seventeen from Going Seventeen, 2016
- "Beautiful", by Shinee from The Misconceptions of Us, 2013
- "Beautiful", by Social Code from A Year at the Movies, 2004
- "Beautiful", by the Smashing Pumpkins from Mellon Collie and the Infinite Sadness, 1995
- "Beautiful", by Verona, 2004
- "Beautiful", by Walker Hayes from Boom, 2017
- "Beautiful", by Zior Park, 2018
- "Beautiful Beautiful", by ONF, 2021

== People ==
- List of people known as the Beautiful

== See also ==
- Beautiful Day, a 2000 song by U2
- Beautiful Garbage, a 2001 album by Garbage
- Biutiful, a 2010 Mexican-Spanish drama film
- "Biutyful", a 2021 song by Coldplay
- Beauty (disambiguation)
- Beautiful Girl (disambiguation)
- You're Beautiful (disambiguation)
- 好美 (disambiguation)
- 真美 (disambiguation)
