= Beauty (disambiguation) =

Beauty is an aesthetic characteristic.

Beauty may also refer to:

== Science and mathematics ==
- Beauty (quantum number) or bottomness, a flavour quantum number
- Mathematical beauty, a type of aesthetic value seen in mathematics

== Characters ==
- Beauty (Belle), a central character in the fairy tale Beauty and the Beast and adaptations
- Beauty, the main character in The Sleeping Beauty Quartet, a series of novels by Anne Rice (writing as A. N. Roquelaure)
- Beauty, anime/manga series character from Bobobo-bo Bo-bobo, see list of characters

== Film and television ==
- Two 1965 films by Andy Warhol:
  - Beauty No. 1
  - Beauty No. 2
- Beauty: In the Eyes of the Beheld, a 2008 American documentary by Liza Figueroa Kravinsky
- Beauty (2009 film), a Japanese film by Toshio Gotō
- Beauty (2011 film), a South African film by Oliver Hermanus
- Beauty (2022 film), an American film by Andrew Dosunmu
- "Beauty" (Once Upon a Time), a 2017 television episode
- The Beauty (TV series), a 2026 American television series

== Literature ==
- Beauty (Selbourne novel), a 2009 novel by Raphael Selbourne
- Beauty (Tepper novel), a 1991 novel by Sheri S. Tepper
- Beauty: A Retelling of the Story of Beauty and the Beast, a 1978 young-adult novel by Robin McKinley
- Beauty, a 1992 novel by Brian D'Amato
- Beauty, a 2012 Anita Blake: Vampire Hunter book by Laurell K. Hamilton
- "Beauty", a 2003 short story by Sherwood Smith

== Music ==
- The Beauties, a Canadian roots/country band

=== Albums ===
- Beauty (Ryuichi Sakamoto album), 1989
- Beauty (Neutral Milk Hotel album), 1992

=== Songs ===
- "Beauty" (song), by Mötley Crüe, 1997
- "Beauty", by Alan, a B-side of the single "Swear", 2009
- "Beauty", by Ayiesha Woods from Introducing Ayiesha Woods, 2006
- "Beauty", by Bellows from Fist & Palm, 2016
- "Beauty", by Blank & Jones from Relax Edition 4, 2009
- "Beauty", by Burn from Do or Die, 2017
- "Beauty", by the Chick Corea Elektric Band from Eye of the Beholder, 1998
- "Beauty", by Daniel Lanois from Here Is What Is, 2007
- "Beauty", by Darzamat from Oniriad, 2003
- "Beauty", by David Gilmour from Rattle That Lock, 2015
- "Beauty", by David Mead from Indiana, 2004
- "Beauty", by Dru Hill from Enter the Dru, 1998
- "Beauty", by Earth, Wind and Fire from The Need of Love, 1971
- "Beauty", by Edan from Beauty and the Beat, 2005
- "Beauty", by Edwyn Collins from Badbea, 2019
- "Beauty", by Einstürzende Neubauten from Silence Is Sexy, 2000
- "Beauty", by Fabolous from The S.O.U.L. Tape 2, 2012
- "Beauty", by Fuzzbox from Big Bang!, 1989
- "Beauty", by Imperial Teen from What Is Not to Love, 2012
- "Beauty", by Jacob Young from Forever Young, 2014
- "Beauty", by James Iha from Let It Come Down, 1998
- "Beauty", by Jamie Isaac from Couch Baby, 2016
- "Beauty", by John Oates from Phunk Shui, 2002
- "Beauty", by KNK from Remain, 2016
- "Beauty", by Matthew Good from Moving Walls, 2020
- "Beauty", by Meat Puppets from Mirage, 1987
- "Beauty", by Maudlin of the Well from My Fruit Psychobells...A Seed Combustible, 1999
- "Beauty", by MGK and Trippie Redd from Genre: Sadboy, 2024
- "Beauty", by Modern English from Pillow Lips, 1990
- "Beauty", by Onew from Life Goes On, 2022
- "Beauty", by Paul Banks from Everybody on My Dick Like They Supposed to Be, 2013
- "Beauty", by Paul Haig from Cinematique, 1991
- "Beauty", by Rage from Speak of the Dead, 2006
- "Beauty", by Refused from Songs to Fan the Flames of Discontent, 1996
- "Beauty", by Salt from Auscultate, 1995
- "Beauty", by Shaye, 2004
- "Beauty", by Stephanie Smith from Not Afraid, 2008
- "Beauty", by Sugizo from Truth?, 1997
- "Beauty", by Tall Dwarfs from Canned Music, 1983
- "Beauty", by Teen Suicide from It's the Big Joyous Celebration, Let's Stir the Honeypot, 2016
- "Beauty", by Ten Shekel Shirt from Risk, 2003
- "Beauty", by Wadada Leo Smith from Luminous Axis, 2002

== People ==
- Beauty Dlulane, South African Member of Parliament
- Beauty Gonzalez (born 1991), Filipino-Spanish actress
- Beauty McGowan (1901–1982), American baseball player
- Beauty Ngxongo (born 1953), South African master Zulu basket weaver
- Beauty Turner (1957–2008), American housing activist and journalist

== Places in the United States ==
- Beauty, Kentucky, an unincorporated community
- Beauty, West Virginia, an unincorporated community
- Beauty Lake, a lake in Montana

== Other uses ==
- Beauty (ancient thought)
- Beauty (dog), a World War II search and rescue dog
- The Beauty, a 1915 Boris Kustodiev painting
- Beauty industry, or sometimes just "Beauty," is a catch-all term for the services and products that deal with feminine appearance (Cosmetics, Hairstyling, etc.)

== See also ==
- Aesthetics, a branch of philosophy dealing with the nature of beauty, art, and taste
- Beauty and the Beast (disambiguation)
- Black Beauty (disambiguation)
- Sleeping Beauty (disambiguation)
- Beautiful (disambiguation)
- Pretty (disambiguation)
- Unattractiveness, the antonym of beauty
