= The Beautiful Girl =

The Beautiful Girl may refer to:

- The Beautiful Girl (1923 film), a 1923 German silent film
- The Beautiful Girl (1969 film), a 1969 Soviet drama film

== See also ==
- The Beautiful Girls, an Australian band
- Beautiful Girl (disambiguation)
