= Sleeping Beauty (disambiguation) =

Sleeping Beauty is a classic fairy tale.

Sleeping Beauty may also refer to:

== Arts and media ==
=== Film ===
- The Sleeping Beauty (1930 film), a Soviet film directed by Georgi Vasilyev and Sergei Vasilyev
- The Sleeping Beauty (1935 film), an American cartoon in the Puppetoon series by George Pal, included in The Puppetoon Movie
- Sleeping Beauty (1942 film), an Italian film
- Sleeping Beauty (1955 film), a 1955 West German film directed by Fritz Genschow
- Sleeping Beauty (1959 film), an American animated film from Walt Disney Pictures
  - Aurora (Sleeping Beauty), the title character of the Disney film
  - Sleeping Beauty (franchise), a Disney media franchise that began in 1959 with the release of Sleeping Beauty
- Sleeping Beauty (1973 film) or Some Call It Loving, a drama by James B. Harris
- Sleeping Beauty (1987 film), a film starring Tahnee Welch
- Sleeping Beauties (film), a 1999 American comedy
- Sleeping Beauty (2010 film), a film by Catherine Breillat
- Sleeping Beauty (2011 film), an Australian film starring Emily Browning
- Sleeping Beauty (2014 film), an American film directed by Casper Van Dien

=== Literature ===
==== Novels ====
- Sleeping Beauty, a 1947 novel by Faith Baldwin
- The Sleeping Beauty, a 1953 novel by English writer Elizabeth Taylor
- Sleeping Beauty (novel), a 1973 novel by Ross Macdonald
- The Sleeping Beauty Quartet, four erotic novels (1983–2015) by Anne Rice writing under the pseudonym A. N. Roquelaure
- Sleeping Beauty, a 1991 novel by Judith Michael
- Sleeping Beauty, a 1993 novel by A. L. Singer, a novelization of the 1959 film
- Sleeping Beauties, a 1993 novel by Susanna Moore
- Sleeping Beauty, a 1995 novel by Jane Donnelly
- Sleeping Beauties, a 1996 novel by Mavis Cheek
- Sleeping Beauty, a 1998 novel by Judith Ivory
- Sleeping Beauty, a 2003 novel by Narinder Dhami, a novelization of the 1959 film
- Sleeping Beauty, a 2004 novel by Phillip Margolin
- Sleeping Beauty: The One Who Took The Really Long Nap, a 2006 novel by Wendy Mass
- The Sleeping Beauty (novel), a 2010 novel by Mercedes Lackey
- Sleeping Beauties (novel), a 2017 novel by Stephen King and Owen King

==== Other literature ====
- "The Day-Dream", an 1842 poem by Alfred Tennyson, a reworking of his 1830 poem "The Sleeping Beauty"
- "Sleeping Beauty" (short story), a 1957 science fiction short story by Arthur C. Clarke

=== Music and theatre ===
==== Operas ====
- La belle au bois dormant (Carafa), by Michele Carafa, 1825
- La belle au bois dormant (Lecocq), by Charles Lecocq, 1900
- Dornröschen (The Sleeping Beauty), by Humperdinck, 1902
- La bella dormente nel bosco, by Respighi, 1922

==== Other stage works ====
- The Sleeping Beauty in the Wood, an extravaganza by James Planché, 1840
- The Sleeping Beauty (ballet), a ballet by Tchaikovsky, originally choreographed by Marius Petipa, 1889
- Prinsessa Ruusunen (Sleeping Beauty), a ballet by Erkki Melartin, 1904

==== Albums ====
- Sleeping Beauty (Sun Ra album) or the title song, 1979
- The Sleeping Beauty (Live in Israel) or the title song by Tiamat, 1994

==== Songs ====
- "Sleeping Beauty" (song), by Divinyls, 1985
- "Sleeping Beauty", by Brotherhood of Man from Higher Than High
- "Sleeping Beauty", by Diaura from Focus
- "Sleeping Beauty", by Lene Lovich from Stateless
- "Sleeping Beauty", by A Perfect Circle from Mer de Noms
- "Sleeping Beauty", by Perfume from Level3
- "The Sleeping Beauty", by Tiamat from Clouds

=== Television ===
- "Sleeping Beauty" (Faerie Tale Theatre), an episode of Faerie Tale Theatre
- "The Sleeping Beauty" (The O.C.), an episode of The O.C.
- "Sleeping Beauty", an episode of Thomas the Tank Engine and Friends
- "Sleeping Beauty", an episode of Nagi-Asu: A Lull in the Sea

=== Other arts ===
- Sleeping Beauty (Cheech & Chong album), a 1976 comedy album by Cheech and Chong
- The Sleeping Beauty (wax figure), a wax figure at Madame Tussauds in London
- Dornröschen (Sussmann-Hellborn), a sculpture ("Sleeping Beauty")
- Sleeping Beauties: Reawakening Fashion, a 2024 exhibition at the Metropolitan Museum of Art in New York City

== People ==
- Francys Arsentiev (1958–1998), American mountaineer whose corpse on Mount Everest was nicknamed "Sleeping Beauty"
- Rosalia Lombardo (1918–1920), one of the last bodies interred in the Capuchin Catacombs of Palermo, Italy

== Places ==
- Sleeping Beauty, Kalinga, a mountain in the Philippines
- Sleeping Beauty Castle, a structure at Disneyland Park and Hong Kong Disneyland Park
- Sleeping Beauty Mountain Provincial Park, British Columbia, Canada
- Sleeping Beauty Peak, a mountain in Washington state, U.S.
- Sleeping Beauty Rock, Taiwan
- Sleeping Beauty Cave, a cave in Peja, Kosovo
- La Bella Durmiente, Peru (Spanish for "Sleeping Beauty"), a mountain

== Science and mathematics ==
- Kleine–Levin syndrome or Sleeping Beauty syndrome, a neurological disorder
- Nicole Delien (born 1995), woman that suffers from Kleine-Levin syndrome and is called "Sleeping Beauty" in the media
- Oxalis corniculata or Sleeping Beauty, a herbaceous plant
- Somnophilia or Sleeping Beauty syndrome, a paraphilia
- Sleeping Beauty (paper with delayed recognition)
- Sleeping Beauty Galaxy or Black Eye Galaxy
- Sleeping Beauty problem, a puzzle in probability
- Sleeping Beauty transposon system, a genetic tool for gene discovery and gene transfer
- Sleeping Beauty, a neologism coined by linguist Ghil'ad Zuckermann as an alternative to extinct language

== Other uses ==
- Sleeping Beauty (canoe), a WWII submersible electric-powered canoe for a frogman to ride
- Sleeping Beauty, a legend in the Western Mountains region of Yunnan, China

== See also ==
- Sleeping Princess (film), a 2010 Turkish film written and directed by Çağan Irmak
