= Black Beauty (disambiguation) =

Black Beauty is an 1877 novel by Anna Sewell.

== Animals ==
- Black Beauty (horse) (born 1996), one-time world record holder for smallest living horse
- "Black Beauty", the nickname of RTMP 81.6.1, a well-preserved fossil of the theropod dinosaur Tyrannosaurus rex

== Art, entertainment, and media ==
=== Adaptations of Sewell's novel ===
- Black Beauty (1921 film), an American film directed by Edward H. Griffith
- Black Beauty (1933 film), an American film
- Black Beauty (1946 film), an American film starring Richard Denning
- Black Beauty (1971 film), starring Mark Lester as Joe Evans and directed by James Hill
- Black Beauty (1978 film), a five-part live-action NBC miniseries
- Black Beauty (1978 film), an animated film produced by Hanna-Barbera for broadcast on CBS
- Black Beauty (1987 film), an Australian animated cartoon
- Black Beauty (1994 film), narrated by Alan Cumming
- Black Beauty (1995 film), an animated film produced by Jetlag Productions for direct-to-video release by GoodTimes Entertainment
- Black Beauty (2020 film), an American film
- The Adventures of Black Beauty, a 1972–74 British television series that utilizes characters from the novel
- The New Adventures of Black Beauty, 1990–91, a sequel series to The Adventures of Black Beauty

=== Fictional vehicles ===
- Black Beauty, the Green Hornet's car

=== Music ===
- "Black Beauty" (1928 song), a jazz piano tune by Duke Ellington
- Black Beauty: Live at the Fillmore West, a live album recorded by Miles Davis in 1970
- Black Beauty (album), a 1973 album by Love
- "Black Beauty", song by Lana Del Rey from the deluxe edition of the album Ultraviolence

== Musical instruments ==
- "Black Beauty", a nickname for the Gibson Les Paul Custom guitar made by the Gibson Guitar Corporation
- Black Beauty, a line of snare drums made by Ludwig-Musser

== Plants ==
- Black beauty, a type of Black rose
- Black Beauty eggplant, a purple-skinned variety of eggplant
- Black Beauty, a muscadine (Vitis rotundifolia) cultivar

== Other uses ==
- Black Beauty, a Tyrannosaurus specimen at the Royal Tyrrell Museum of Palaeontology
- "Black Beauty", nickname of meteorite Northwest Africa 7034
- "Black Beauty", nickname of the car of A1 Team New Zealand
- "Black Beauties", street name for an amphetamine drug, bearing chemical structure akin to Adderall

== See also ==
- Black is beautiful
