= Liza Figueroa Kravinsky =

- Born: Elizabeth Teopaco Figueroa; 1962; Summit, New Jersey, U.S.
- Citizenship: USA
- Education: Oberlin College
- Occupation(s): Composer, filmmaker, actress
- Notable work: Co-founder of Art Palette Productions, Inc., Founder of the Go-Go Symphony
- Spouse: Michael Kravinsky
- Website: Go-Go Symphony

Liza Figueroa Kravinsky (born 1962) is an American composer, filmmaker, and actress living in Arlington, Virginia, USA. She is best known for composing the Go-Go Symphony and founding the Go-Go Symphony ensemble. She is also the filmmaker of the documentary Beauty in the Eyes of the Beheld.

== Early life ==
Kravinsky was born in Summit, New Jersey to Filipino immigrant parents. Her birth name is Elizabeth Teopaco Figueroa, with "Liza" as a nickname. Her father, Armando Borja Figueroa, was a medical doctor and her mother, Elnora Teopaco Figueroa, was a professional pianist and violinist. After moving to New York State, the Philippines, and northern Virginia; her family settled down in Fort Washington, Maryland where she grew up with her brother Kenneth Figueroa, now a medical doctor. She attended St. Stephens & St. Agnes School in Alexandria, Virginia; and Oberlin College in Oberlin, Ohio; where she studied music composition and theory. She is married to filmmaker and former ABC News video editor Michael Kravinsky.

== Musical work ==
Kravinsky composed and played keyboards for local pop, R&B, and go-go bands in the Washington DC area after she graduated from college. From 1988 to 1990, she toured with Motown recording artist Stacy Lattisaw; TRJ, a faction of go-go band Trouble Funk; and go-go band Pleasure. In 1991, she composed for, directed, and performed with Robin Power and the Uptown Dames, a Paisley Park project created by Prince.

In 1994, she became an in-house composer at American Film and Video production company in Silver Spring, Maryland. While working in this company, she learned how to produce videos.

In 1999, her song "New Little Girl" appeared on the "Octaves Beyond Silence" compilation album, along with songs by Eve Ensler, The Indigo Girls and Meshell Ndegeocello.

In 2012, she composed the Go-Go Symphony, an innovative symphony that combines Washington DC's go-go dance beats with classical, jazz, and funk genres. She founded the Go-Go Symphony ensemble to perform it, along with other similar compositions; in partnership with full symphony orchestras, or as a stand-alone ensemble.

== Film work ==
In 1996, Kravinsky co-founded Art Palette Productions, Inc., which produces videos, documentaries, and original music. She created Beauty in the Eyes of the Beheld; a documentary about the lives of ordinary American women who are considered physically beautiful. Among other corporate video productions, she produced The First Three to Five Seconds, a widely viewed Arab and Muslim cultural sensitivity training video for the United States Department of Justice. She has also composed scores for independent films and acted in television commercials and video productions.
