= Thumbelina (horse) =

Dwarf miniature horse

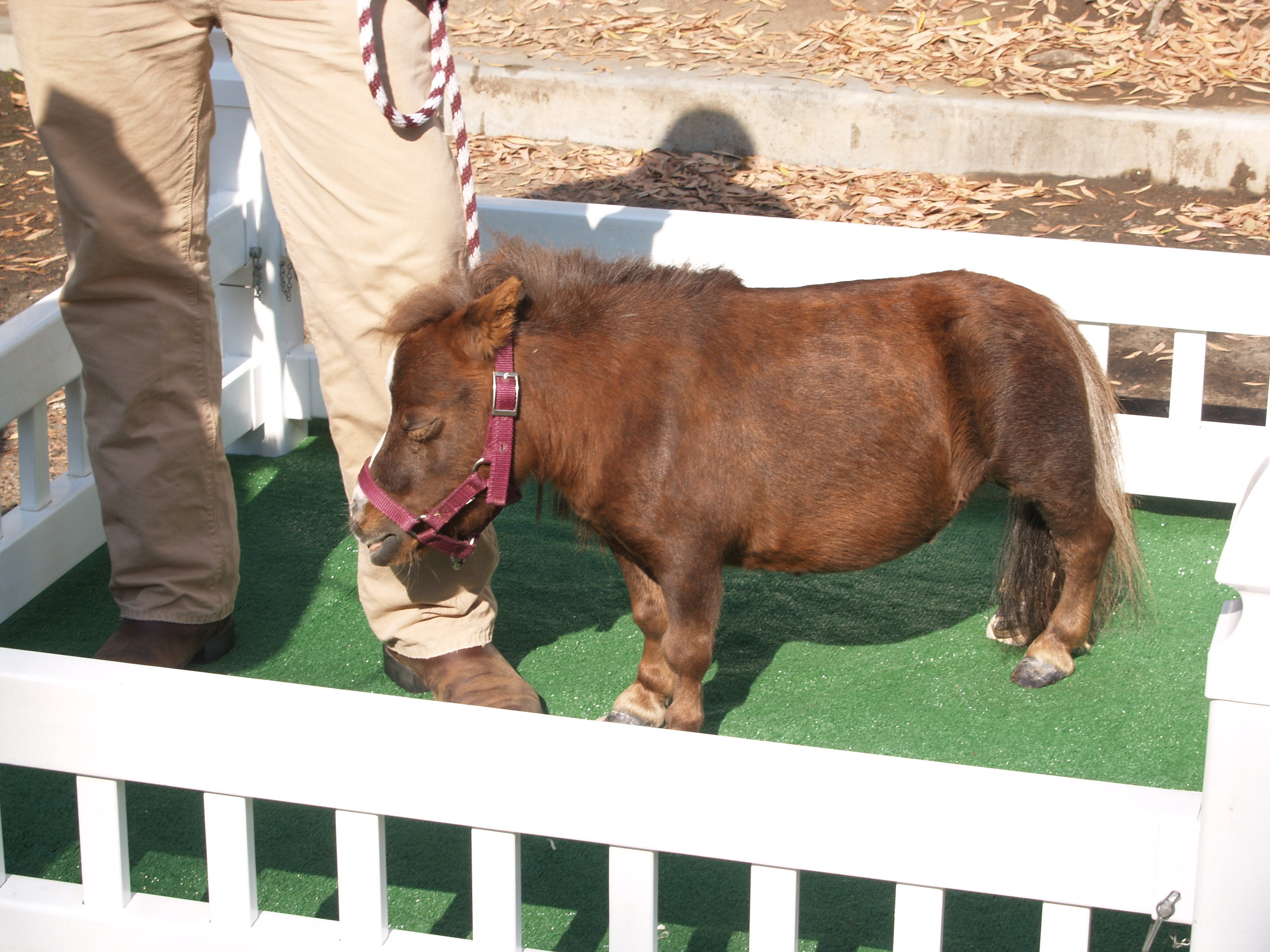
- Species: Horse
- Sex: Female
- Born: May 1, 2001; St. Louis, U.S.
- Died: 2018
- Weight: 26 kg (57 lb)
- Awards: Smallest horse

Thumbelina (born May 1, 2001, died in 2018) was a dwarf miniature horse and the smallest horse on record. She stood 43 cm (17 inches; 4.1 hands) tall and weighed 26 kilograms (57 lb), and received the title of world's smallest from Guinness World Records. Thumbelina was born in St. Louis, Missouri. Her owners, Paul and Kay Goessling, and her handler, Michael Goessling, Nadja and Jaka Lesnik cared for her and other miniature horses on their farm in Ladue. Thumbelina died in 2018.

== See also ==
- Black Beauty, the previous horse often recognized as the smallest.
