= Verona (band) =

Venezuelan rock band

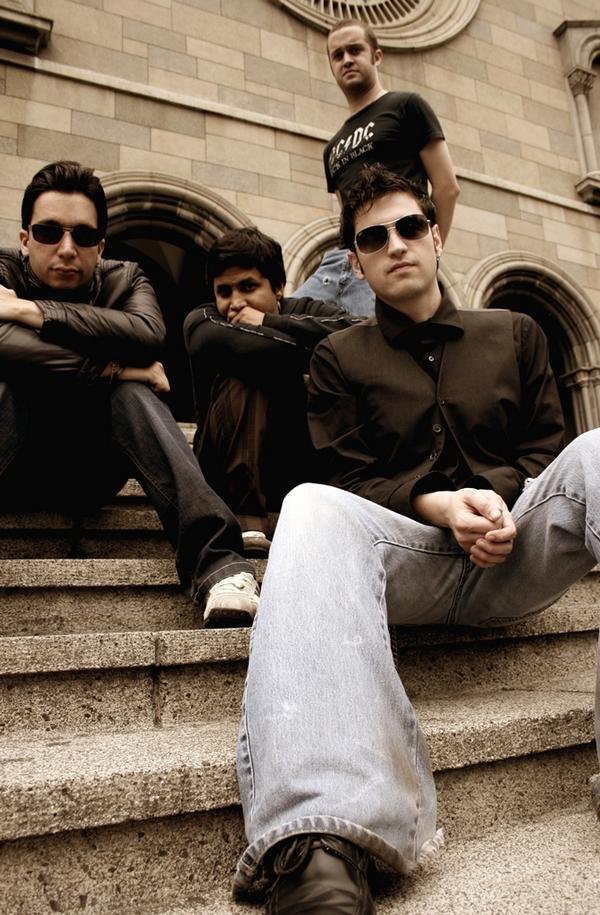
- Verona, 2008

Background information
- Origin: Punto Fijo, Falcón, Venezuela
- Genres: Rock
- Years active: 2001 - Present
- Labels: Independent
- Members: Chevy; Atari; Eduardo Goitia
- Past members: Paul Jatem; Adolfo Alcala; Ray Diaz
- Website: Verona

Verona is a Venezuelan rock band formed in Punto Fijo in 2000 by Chevy (guitar and vocals), Atari (guitar and backing vocals), Paúl Jatem (bass guitar), and Eduardo (drums). In 2001, they recorded their first EP, Delirium, which included earlier recordings from Chevy. Paúl left the band in 2003 and was replaced by Adolfo Alcala. Alcala was credited with the composition of Verona's first LP, Summer Consequence, but he left before its recording. He was replaced by Ray Diaz in December 2003. In May 2004, Verona released Summer Consequence. They went on to release their second LP, Anywhere in March 2008.

== Members ==
=== Current ===
- Chevy – lead vocals, guitar, keyboards
- Atari – guitar, backing vocals, keyboards
- Eduardo Goitia – drums, percussion

=== Former ===
- Paúl Jatem – bass guitar
- Adolfo Alcalá – bass guitar
- Ray Díaz – bass guitar

== Discography ==
- Delirium EP (2001)
- Summer Consequence (2004)
- Anywhere (2008)
- "Silent Night" CDS (2009)
- "Alibis & Paybacks" CDS (2012)
- "Summer Consequence Remastered - 10 Year Anniversary" CDS (2014)

== See also ==
- List of alternative rock artists
