= Black Beauty (horse) =

Miniature horse

Black Beauty was formerly listed in the Guinness World Records as the smallest living horse, a record she held from 2001 to 2006 until the record was taken by Thumbelina.

When Black Beauty was born on June 6, 1996, her owners, Donald and Janet Burleson, knew she was smaller than any other miniature horse. She was only 12 inches (30 cm) in height and less than 10 lb (4.5 kg) in weight. To qualify for Guinness World Records as the World's Smallest Horse, Black Beauty had to be taken to a veterinarian to be measured with careful precision. At the age of five years she was 18.5 inches (47 cm) tall at her withers.
