= Nicole Delien =

American sufferer of Kleine–Levin syndrome (born 1995)

- Born: Nicole Garrett; November 6, 1995 (age 30); New Castle, Pennsylvania
- Other names: "The real life Sleeping Beauty"
- Known for: Advocacy of Kleine–Levin syndrome

Nicole Delien (born November 6, 1995) is an American woman known for bringing awareness in the media to Kleine–Levin syndrome, a rare sleeping disorder that affects about 1,000 people around the world.

Delien is a United States Pennsylvania resident that was diagnosed with Kleine–Levin Syndrome (KLS) when she was six-and-a-half years old. A doctor at Allegheny General Hospital was the one who was finally able to identify Nicole’s symptoms. In 2012, at 17 years old, Delien started to bring awareness to KLS by appearing in a number of media events to provide a real-life example of the syndrome.

The syndrome causes Delien to sleep for 18–19 hours a day on average and to sleep for longer stretches of time as well, including a 64-day block of time in 2012. The disorder is characterized by episodic periods of hypersomnia and lethargy. These episodes can last anywhere from days to weeks and can last in the patient from eight to twelve years before disappearing altogether. Delien's parents and siblings do not suffer from the disorder.

KLS has caused Delien to miss many family holidays and celebrations, including Thanksgiving and Christmas. After winning tickets to a Katy Perry concert, Delien was unable to attend because of an episode. Upon hearing about Delien, Perry arranged for a meeting backstage after a performance at a subsequent show in nearby Connecticut.

Delien has appeared on CBS news, The TODAY Show, the Jeff Probst Show, ABC Primetime Medical Mysteries, WPXI News, WTAE News, and other media outlets.
