= Sleeping Beauty Peak =

Mountain in Washington (state), United States

Sleeping Beauty
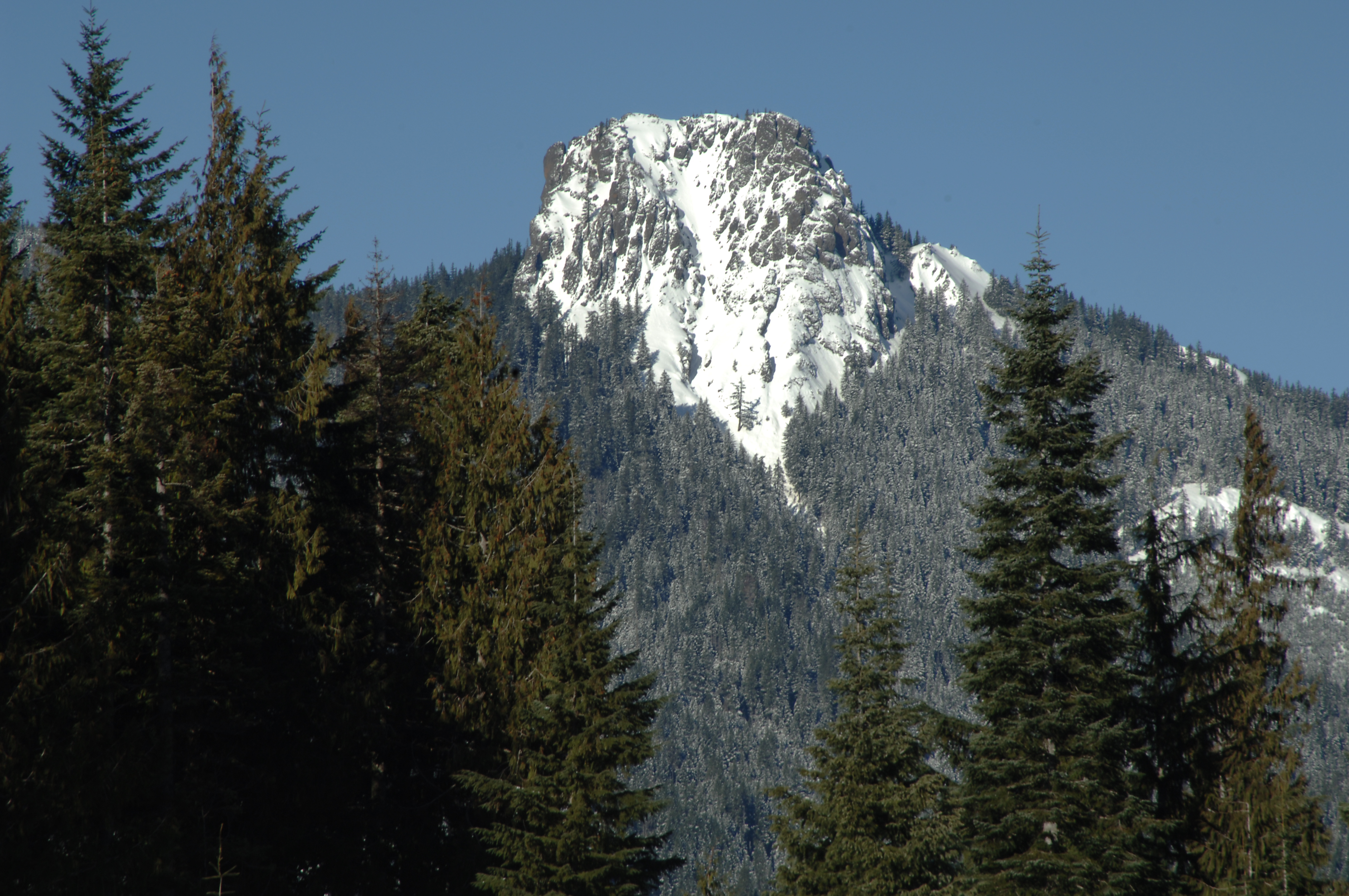
- Sleeping Beauty in winter

Highest point
- Elevation: 4,907 ft (1,496 m)
- Prominence: 347 ft (106 m)
- Coordinates: 46°05′35″N 121°38′58″W

Geography
- Location within Washington (state) Location within the United States
- Location: Skamania County, Washington, U.S.
- Parent range: Cascades
- Topo map: USGS Sleeping Beauty

Geology
- Rock type: Andesite basalt

Climbing
- Easiest route: Hiking

Sleeping Beauty is a 4,907-foot (1,496 m) mountain summit located in the Gifford Pinchot National Forest of Skamania County in Washington state. It is situated in the Cascade Range, 10.73 mi (17.27 km) southwest of Mount Adams. Sleeping Beauty is so named because its profile as seen from the east side of the Trout Lake Valley somewhat resembles a sleeping woman. Precipitation runoff from Sleeping Beauty drains into tributaries of the White Salmon River. The peak is composed of andesitic magma that intruded up into older volcanic rocks more than 25 million years ago and is now surrounded by a forest of old-growth Douglas fir and mountain hemlock. Sleeping Beauty Peak Trail is a 1.4 mile steep trail that ends at the base of the rock outcrop known as Sleeping Beauty. The peak was the site of a former fire lookout tower that was constructed in 1931.

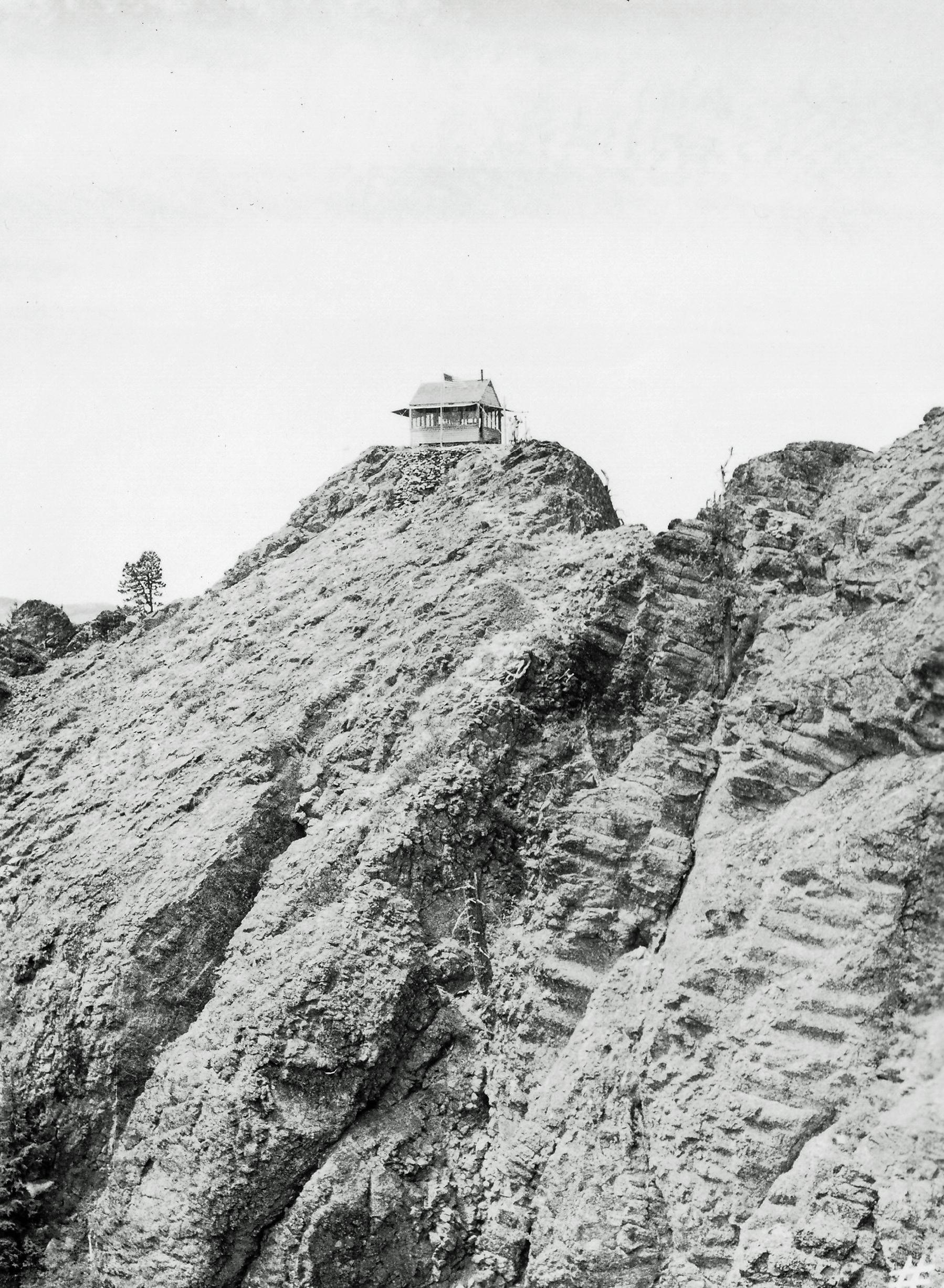
Sleeping Beauty Lookout, 1944

== Climate ==
Sleeping Beauty is located in the marine west coast climate zone of western North America. Most weather fronts originate in the Pacific Ocean, and travel northeast toward the Cascade Mountains. As fronts approach, they are forced upward by the peaks of the Cascade Range (Orographic lift), causing them to drop their moisture in the form of rain or snowfall onto the Cascades. As a result, the west side of the Cascades experiences high precipitation, especially during the winter months in the form of snowfall. During winter months, weather is usually cloudy, but due to high pressure systems over the Pacific Ocean that intensify during summer months, there is often little or no cloud cover during the summer. The months July through September offer the most favorable weather for viewing or climbing this peak.
