= Sugar Puff =

Pony that lived to a record age

- Born: 1951
- Died: 25 May 2007 (aged 55–56) West Sussex, United Kingdom
- Known for: Oldest living horse in the United Kingdom

Sugar Puff (1951 - 25 May 2007) was the oldest living pony at age 56 until his death in May 2007.
