= Beauty Lake =

- Location within Montana Location within the United States
- Location: Park County, Montana
- Coordinates: 45.1056°N 109.9710°W
- Type: lake
- Basin countries: United States
- Surface elevation: 9,226 ft (2,812 m)

Beauty Lake is a lake in Park County, Montana, in the United States.

Beauty Lake was named for its natural scenery.

== See also ==
- List of lakes in Montana
