= Beauty: In the Eyes of the Beheld =

- Directed by: Liza Figueroa Kravinsky
- Cinematography: Pruitt Allen; Pascal Jouffriault
- Edited by: Michael Kravinsky
- Music by: Liza Figueroa Kravinsky
- Production company: Art Palette Productions
- Release date: November 1, 2008
- Running time: 55 minutes
- Country: United States
- Language: English
- Budget: $50,000

Beauty: In the Eyes of the Beheld is a 2008 American documentary film that explores what it is like to be a beautiful woman through interviews of eight American women considered physically beautiful. The women interviewed include a physician, an exotic dancer, a musician who worked with recording artist Prince, former beauty queens, a student in a wheelchair, an assistant paralegal, and an assistant television producer. Eye opening stories of insecurity, vulnerability and tragedy surface along with the more predictable blessings beauty brings. The preview asks " Is beauty all it is cracked to be?" Surprising stories surface as they speak about their childhoods, careers, relationships, and life satisfaction. Beauty: In the Eyes of the Beheld is included in the National Eating Disorders Association's list of body image educational tools.

Director and producer Liza Figueroa Kravinsky explores these perceptions, those of the women of themselves, and how they feel they are perceived by the outside world, by the impossible "ideal" created and demanded by the media, ideals that are modified from season to season. A study of skin-deep attractiveness, the film offers empowering insights into inner beauty as well.

== Synopsis ==
Society tells us that beautiful women have it all. But beauty can be as much a curse as it is a blessing. Being beautiful doesn't equate to happiness; "Being beautiful is overrated", says the filmmaker. In the film eight women labeled as beautiful consider body image issues through their candid stories of how concepts and realities of physical beauty have shaped their lives in both good ways and bad. Objectification, negative stereotyping, jealousy, insecurity, and vulnerability are prominent themes, as are opportunity and preferential treatment.

Kravinsky states: "Beauty making things easier for a woman is a double edged sword." The film looks at how being beautiful affects relationships and self-esteem as well as career. It may be easier for a beautiful woman to find a date or a job, but the film seeks to show that having things come easier creates jealousy and laziness and does not encourage development of the inner beauty that a woman needs as she grows older and her beauty fades. Kravinsky compares beauty to sugar: it is very sweet, but too much of it can be a killer.

== Interviewees ==
- Sarah (name withheld): Paralegal
- Stephanie Brink: Miss California Teen USA 2005
- Gasby Brown: Entrepreneur and Artist
- Evonne Burns: Exotic Dancer
- Joan Daniel: Bass Player, Prince Protege
- Danielle Smith: Student
- Kathie Truitt: Mrs. Missouri 1996
- Sandra (name withheld): Physician
- Emily (name withheld): Television Production Assistant

== Perceptions ==
"We were impressed with the lively discussion the film generated among the audience about issues related to female beauty", commented Adele Schmidt and Erica Ginsberg, co-founders of Docs in Progress, which screened the film as a work in progress.

Alan Duffy, the Health Educator at American University, called Kravinsky's film "compelling" and added, "[Liza] provided an insightful question and answer session after the screening, which engaged the audience for more than twenty minutes."

=== Perceptions and Palin ===
"Beautiful women are often stereotyped as being conceited, superficial, dumb people who rely on their looks to get everything they want in life. That perception does not help someone running for vice president of the United States", Kravinsky contends. "Sarah Palin has been stereotyped and underestimated by press and public." "Palin's looks helped her get a job as a sportscaster. The resulting fame may have helped her win an election to public office."

"When beautiful women reach a certain level in their careers, perceived competence becomes an issue. Just listen to all the jokes you hear about Palin being a 'hottie.' Being named a 'hottie' when running for office for a potential commander in chief was not productive."

== Accolades ==
- Moondance International Festival semi-finalist
- Indie Spirit Film Festival
- Girl Fest Hawaii Film Festival
