= Konomi =

- Gender: Female

Origin
- Origin: Japanese
- Meaning: Different meanings depending on the kanji used

Konomi (written: 好美 or このみ in hiragana) is a feminine Japanese given name. Notable people with the name include:

- Konomi Asazu (浅津 このみ; born 1986), Japanese bobsledder
- Konomi Inagaki (稲垣 好), Japanese voice actress
- Konomi Kai (甲斐 好美; born 1993), Japanese long jumper
- Konomi Kohara (小原 好美; born 1992), Japanese voice actress
- Konomi Suzuki (鈴木 このみ), Japanese singer
- Konomi Taniguchi (谷口 木乃実; born 1995), Japanese footballer
- Konomi Takeishi (武石 この実; born 1991), Japanese sprinter
- Konomi Watanabe (渡邉 このみ; born 2006), Japanese child actress

Konomi (written: 許斐) is also a Japanese surname. Notable people with the surname include:

- Takeshi Konomi (許斐 剛; born 1970), Japanese manga artist
