= You're Beautiful (disambiguation) =

"You're Beautiful" is a 2005 single by James Blunt.

You're Beautiful or You Are Beautiful may also refer to:

- You're Beautiful (TV series), a South Korean television drama
- "You're Beautiful" (Nathaniel Willemse song), 2014
- "You're Beautiful", a 2011 song by Taio Cruz from TY.O
- "You Are Beautiful," a public art project by Matthew Hoffman
- "You Are Beautiful" (song), a Rodgers and Hammerstein song from the 1958 musical Flower Drum Song

== See also ==
- Beautiful (disambiguation)
- "The Last Farewell", a song by Roger Whittaker with the lyrics "You are beautiful"
