= Beautiful Girl =

Beautiful Girl(s) may refer to:

== Film and television ==
- Beautiful Girl (film), a 2003 film directed by Douglas Barr
- Beautiful Girls (film), a 1996 film starring Matt Dillon and Uma Thurman
- "Beautiful Girls" (Desperate Housewives), a 2006 episode of Desperate Housewives
- "The Beautiful Girls" (Mad Men), a 2010 episode of Mad Men
- Beautiful Girl (1990 film), a Philippine film starring Romnick Sarmenta

== Music ==
- The Beautiful Girls, an Australian band
- "Beautiful Girl" (Bing Crosby song), 1933
- "Beautiful Girl" (George Harrison song), 1976
- "Beautiful Girl" (INXS song), 1992
- "Beautiful Girls" (Sean Kingston song), 2007
- "Beautiful Girls" (Van Halen song), 1979
- "Beautiful Girl", a song by Aztec Camera from Frestonia
- "Beautiful Girl", a song by Chord Overstreet
- "Beautiful Girl", a song by Jose Mari Chan
- "Beautiful Girl", a song by Christian Bautista
- "Beautiful Girl", a song by Meja from Seven Sisters
- "Beautiful Girl", a song by Michael Jackson from The Ultimate Collection
- "Beautiful Girl", a song by Robyn Hitchcock from Eye
- "Beautiful Girl", a song by Sophie B. Hawkins from Wilderness
