= Erosion and tectonics =

Interactions between erosion and tectonics and their implications

The interaction between erosion and tectonics has been a topic of debate since the early 1990s. While the tectonic effects on surface processes such as erosion have long been recognized (for example, river formation as a result of tectonic uplift), the opposite (erosional effects on tectonic activity) has only recently been addressed. The primary questions surrounding this topic are what types of interactions exist between erosion and tectonics and what are the implications of these interactions. While this is still a matter of debate, one thing is clear, Earth's landscape is a product of two factors: tectonics, which can create topography and maintain relief through surface and rock uplift, and climate, which mediates the erosional processes that wear away upland areas over time. The interaction of these processes can form, modify, or destroy geomorphic features on Earth's surface.

Interactions and feedback pathways for tectonics and erosional processes

== Tectonic processes ==
The term tectonics refers to the study of Earth's surface structure and the ways in which it changes over time. Tectonic processes typically occur at plate boundaries which are one of three types: convergent boundaries, divergent boundaries, or transform boundaries. These processes form and modify the topography of the Earth's surface, effectively increasing relief through the mechanisms of isostatic uplift, crustal thickening, and deformation in the form of faulting and folding. Increased elevations, in relation to regional base levels, lead to steeper river channel gradients and an increase in orographically localized precipitation, ultimately resulting in drastically increased erosion rates. The topography, and general relief, of a given area determines the velocity at which surface runoff will flow, ultimately determining the potential erosive power of the runoff. Longer, steeper slopes are more prone to higher rates of erosion during periods of heavy rainfall than shorter, gradually sloping areas. Thus, large mountain ranges, and other areas of high relief, formed through tectonic uplift will have significantly higher rates of erosion. Additionally, tectonics can directly influence erosion rates on a short timescale, as is clear in the case of earthquakes, which can trigger landslides and weaken surrounding rock through seismic disturbances.

While tectonic uplift in any case will lead to some form of increased elevation, thus higher rates of erosion, a primary focus is set on isostatic uplift as it provides a fundamental connection between the causes and effects of erosional-tectonic interactions.

=== Isostatic uplift ===
Understanding the principle of isostasy is a key element to understanding the interactions and feedbacks shared between erosion and tectonics. The principle of isostasy states that when free to move vertically, lithosphere floats at an appropriate level in the asthenosphere so that the pressure at a depth of compensation in the asthenosphere well below the base of the lithosphere is the same. Isostatic uplift is both a cause and an effect of erosion. When deformation occurs in the form of crustal thickening an isostatic response is induced causing the thickened crust to sink, and surrounding thinner crust to uplift. The resulting surface uplift leads to enhanced elevations, which in turn induces erosion. Alternatively, when a large amount of material is eroded away from the Earth's surface uplift occurs in order to maintain isostatic equilibrium. Because of isostasy, high erosion rates over significant horizontal areas can effectively suck up material from the lower crust and/or upper mantle. This process is known as isostatic rebound and is analogous to Earth's response following the removal of large glacial ice sheets.

Isostatic uplift and corresponding erosion are responsible for the formation of regional-scale geologic features as well as localized structures. Two such examples include:

Formation of a river anticline

- Continental shields – Generally large areas of low relief (<100 m) in Earth's crust where Precambrian crystalline igneous and high-grade metamorphic rocks are exposed. Shields are considered tectonically stable areas in comparison to the activity occurring at their margins and the boundaries between plates, but their formation required large amounts of tectonic activity and erosion. Shields, along with stable platforms, are the basic tectonic components of continents, therefore understanding their development is critical to understanding the development of other surface features on Earth. Initially, a mountain belt is formed at a convergent plate margin. Transformation of a mountain belt to a shield is majorly dependent on two factors: (1) erosion of the mountain belt by running water and (2) isostatic adjustment resulting from the removal of surface rock due to erosion. This process of erosion followed by isostatic adjustment continues until the system is at isostatic equilibrium. At this point large-scale erosion can no longer occur because the surface has eroded down to nearly sea-level and uplift ceases due to the system's state of equilibrium.
- River anticlines – Geologic structures formed through the focused uplift of rock underlying confined areas of high erosion (i.e., rivers). Isostatic rebound resulting from the rapid removal of overlying rock, via erosion, causes the weakened areas of crustal rock to uplift from the apex of the river. In order for the development of these structures to occur the erosion rate of the river must exceed both the average erosional rate of the area, and the rate of uplift of the orogen. The two factors influencing the development of these structures are stream power of the associated river and the flexural rigidity of the crust in the area. The combination of increased stream power with decreased flexural rigidity results in the system's progression from a transverse anticline to a river anticline.

=== Channel flow ===
Channel flow describes the process through which hot, viscous crustal material flows horizontally between the upper crust and lithospheric mantle, and is eventually pushed to the surface. This model aims to explain features common to metamorphic hinterlands of some collisional orogens, most notably the Himalaya–Tibetan Plateau system. In mountainous areas with heavy rainfall (thus, high erosion rates) deeply incising rivers will form. As these rivers wear away the Earth's surface two things occur: (1) pressure is reduced on the underlying rocks effectively making them weaker and (2) the underlying material moves closer to the surface. This reduction of crustal strength, coupled with the erosional exhumation, allows for the diversion of the underlying channel flow toward Earth's surface.

== Erosional processes ==
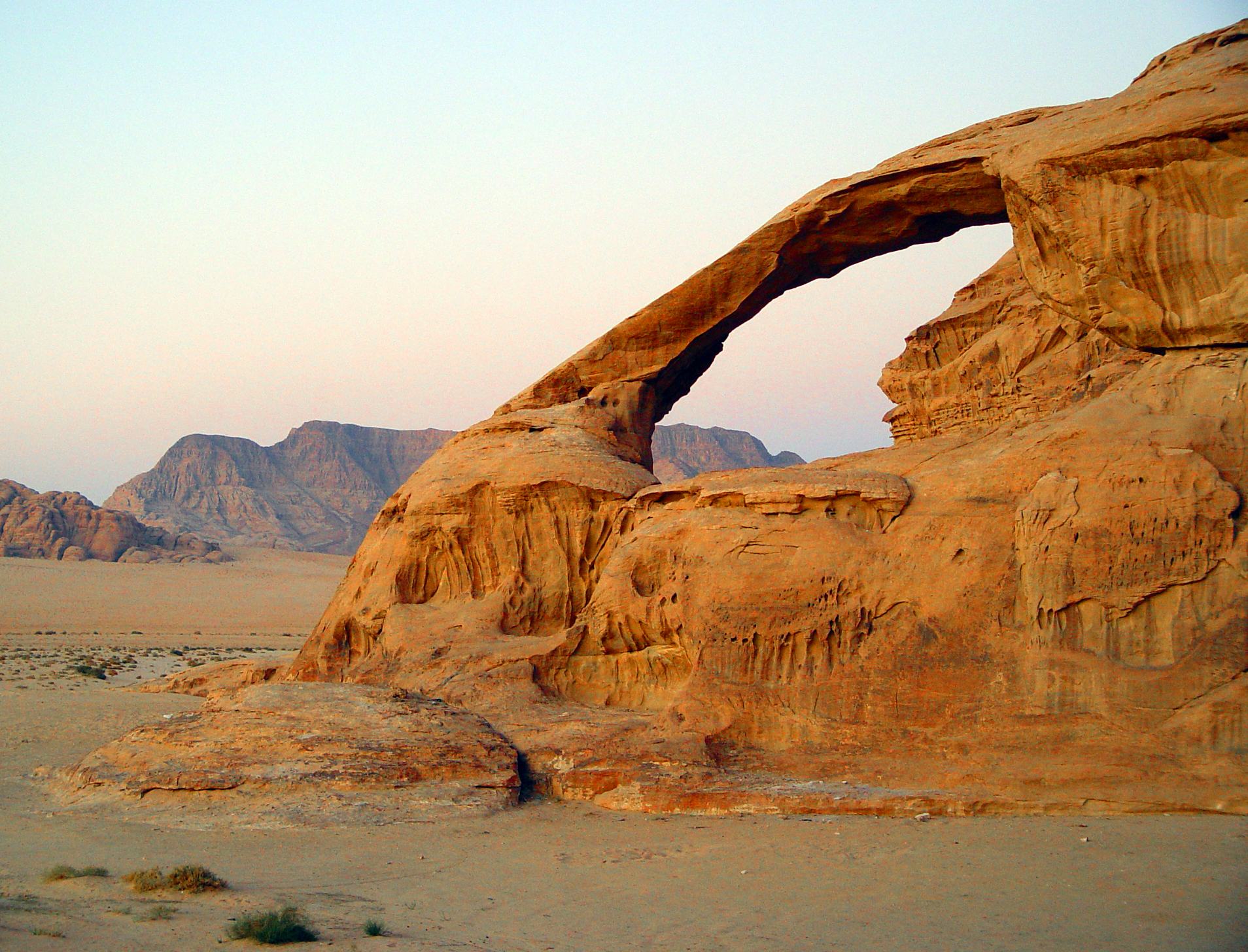
A natural arch produced by erosion of differentially weathered rock in Jebel Kharaz (Jordan)

The term erosion refers to the group of natural processes, including weathering, dissolution, abrasion, corrosion, and transportation, by which material is worn away from Earth's surface to be transported and deposited in other locations.

- Differential erosion – Erosion that occurs at irregular or varying rates, caused by the differences in the resistance and hardness of surface materials; softer and weaker rocks are rapidly worn away, whereas harder and more resistant rocks remain to form ridges, hills, or mountains. Differential erosion, along with the tectonic setting, are two of the most important controls on the evolution of continental landscapes on Earth.

The feedback of erosion on tectonics is given by the transportation of surface, or near-surface, mass (rock, soil, sand, regolith, etc.) to a new location. This redistribution of material can have profound effects on the state of gravitational stresses in the area, dependent on the magnitude of mass transported. Because tectonic processes are highly dependent on the current state of gravitational stresses, redistribution of surface material can lead to tectonic activity. While erosion in all of its forms, by definition, wears away material from the Earth's surface, the process of mass wasting as a product of deep fluvial incision has the highest tectonic implications.

=== Mass wasting ===
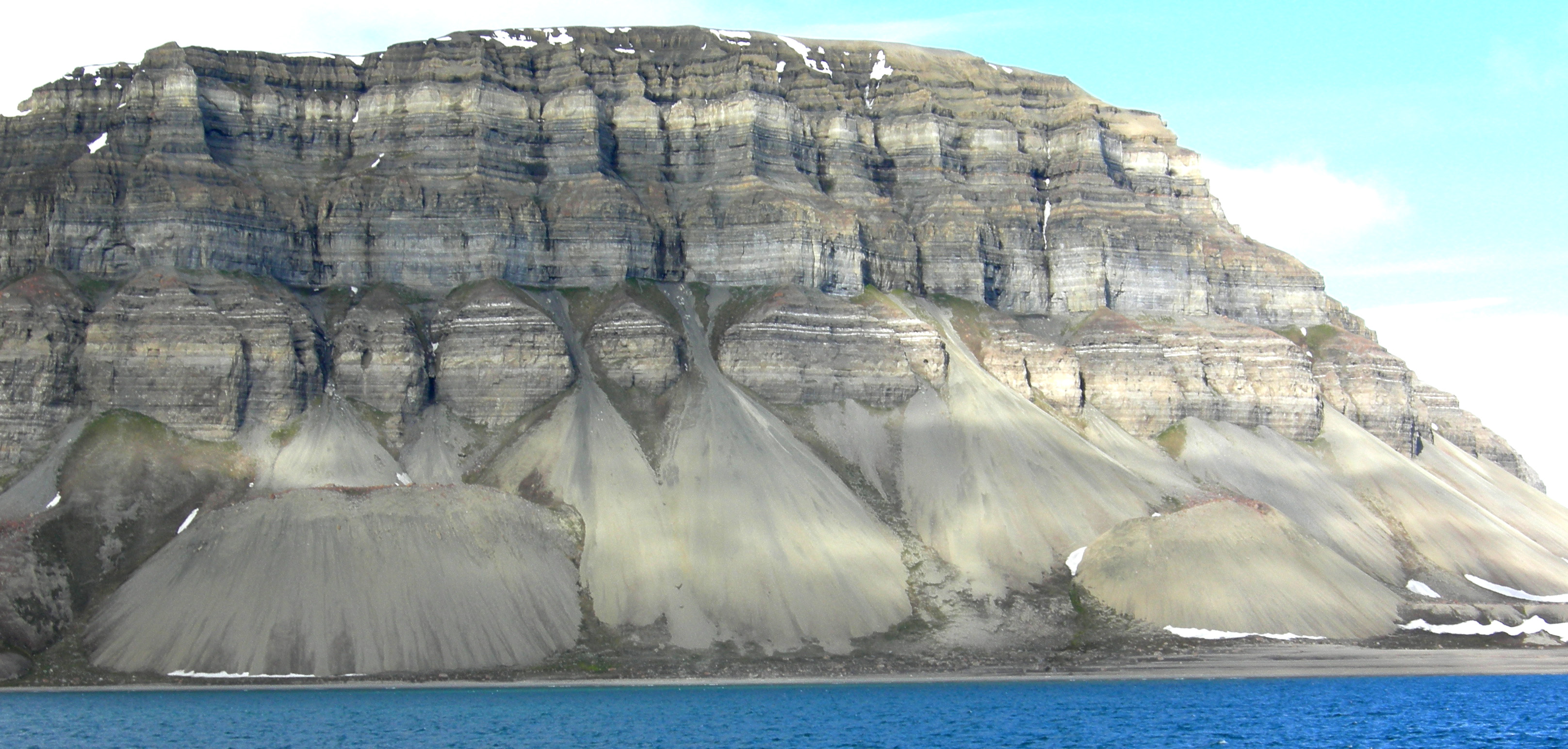
Talus cones produced by mass wasting, north shore of Isfjord, Svalbard, Norway.

Mass wasting is the geomorphic process by which surface material move downslope typically as a mass, largely under the force of gravity As rivers flow down steeply sloping mountains, deep channel incision occurs as the river's flow wears away the underlying rock. Large channel incision progressively decreases the amount of gravitational force needed for a slope failure event to occur, eventually resulting in mass wasting. Removal of large amounts of surface mass in this fashion will induce an isostatic response resulting in uplift until equilibrium is reached.

=== Effects on structural evolution ===
Recent studies have shown that erosional and tectonic processes have an effect on the structural evolution of some geologic features, most notably orogenic wedges. Highly useful sand box models, in which horizontal layers of sand are slowly pressed against a backstop, have shown that the geometries, structures, and kinematics of orogenic wedge formation with and without erosion and sedimentation are significantly different. Numerical models also show that the evolution of orogens, their final tectonic structure, and the potential development of a high plateau, all are sensitive to the long term climate over the mountains, for example, the concentration of precipitation in one side of the orogen due to orographic lift under a dominant wind direction.

== See also ==
- Dynamic topography
- Glacial buzzsaw
- Orogenic collapse
- Post-glacial rebound
