= Erosion =

Natural processes removing soil and rock

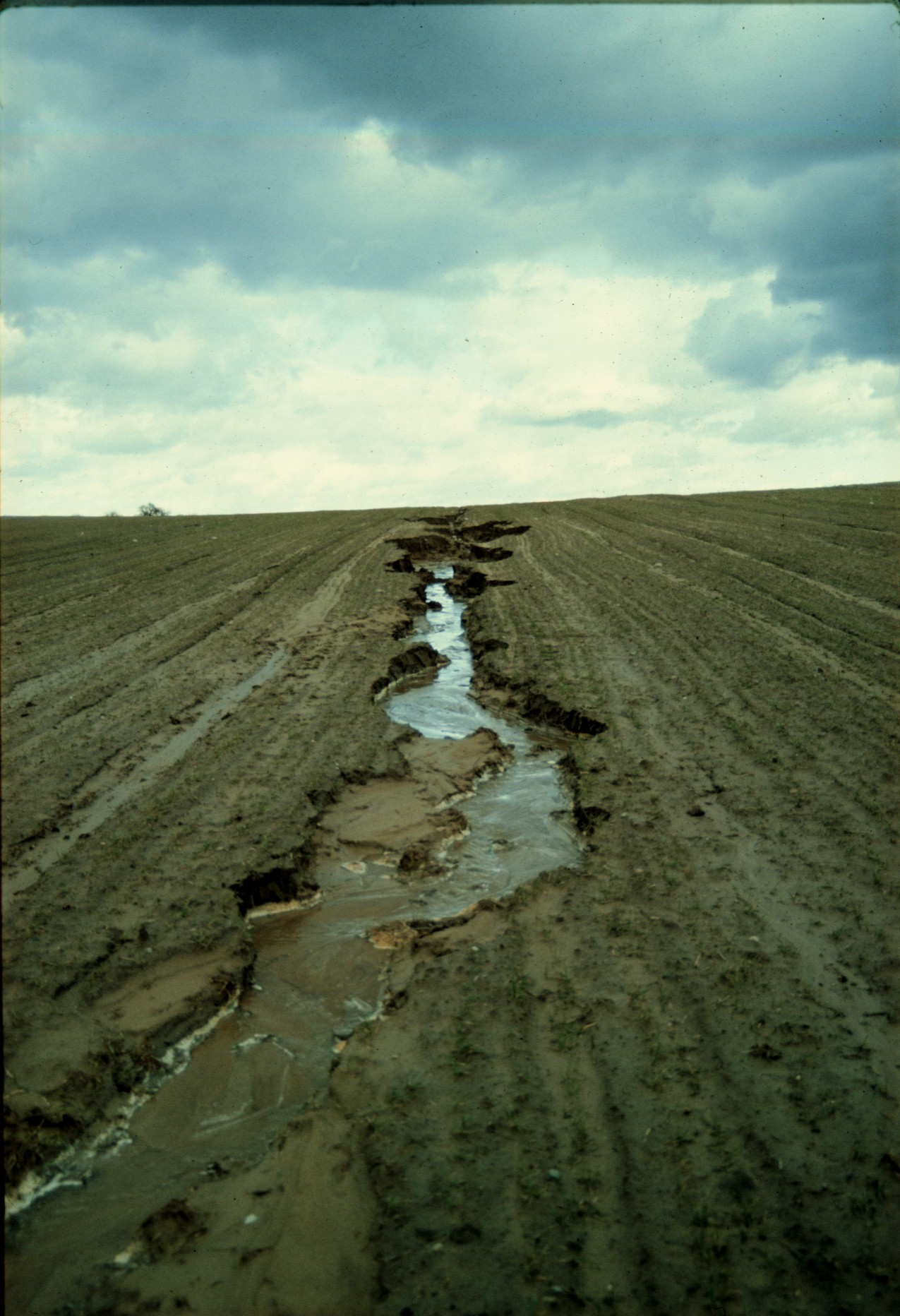
An actively eroding rill on an intensively-farmed field in eastern Germany. This phenomenon is aggravated by poor agricultural practices because when ploughing, the furrows were traced in the direction of the slope rather than that of the terrain contour lines.

Erosion is the action of surface processes (such as water flow or wind) that removes soil, rock, or dissolved material from one location on the Earth's crust and then transports it to another location where it is deposited. Erosion is distinct from weathering which involves no movement. Removal of rock or soil as clastic sediment is referred to as physical or mechanical erosion; this contrasts with chemical erosion, where soil or rock material is removed from an area by dissolution. Eroded sediment or solutes may be transported just a few millimetres, or for thousands of kilometres.

Agents of erosion include rainfall; bedrock wear in rivers; coastal erosion by the sea and waves; glacial plucking, abrasion, and scour; areal flooding; wind abrasion; groundwater processes; and mass movement processes in steep landscapes like landslides and debris flows. The rates at which such processes act control how fast a surface is eroded. Typically, physical erosion proceeds the fastest on steeply sloping surfaces, and rates may also be sensitive to some climatically controlled properties including amounts of water supplied (e.g., by rain), storminess, wind speed, wave fetch, or atmospheric temperature (especially for some ice-related processes). Feedbacks are also possible between rates of erosion and the amount of eroded material that is already carried by, for example, a river or glacier. The transport of eroded materials from their original location is followed by deposition, which is arrival and emplacement of material at a new location.

While erosion is a natural process, human activities have increased by 10–40 times the rate at which soil erosion is occurring globally. At agriculture sites in the Appalachian Mountains, intensive farming practices have caused erosion at up to 100 times the natural rate of erosion in the region. Excessive (or accelerated) erosion causes both "on-site" and "off-site" problems. On-site impacts include decreases in agricultural productivity and (on natural landscapes) ecological collapse, both because of loss of the nutrient-rich upper soil layers. In some cases, this leads to desertification. Off-site effects include sedimentation of waterways and eutrophication of water bodies, as well as sediment-related damage to roads and houses. Water and wind erosion are the two primary causes of land degradation; combined, they are responsible for about 84% of the global extent of degraded land, making excessive erosion one of the most significant environmental problems worldwide.

Intensive agriculture, deforestation, roads, anthropogenic climate change and urban sprawl are amongst the most significant human activities in regard to their effect on stimulating erosion. However, there are many prevention and remediation practices that can curtail or limit erosion of vulnerable soils.

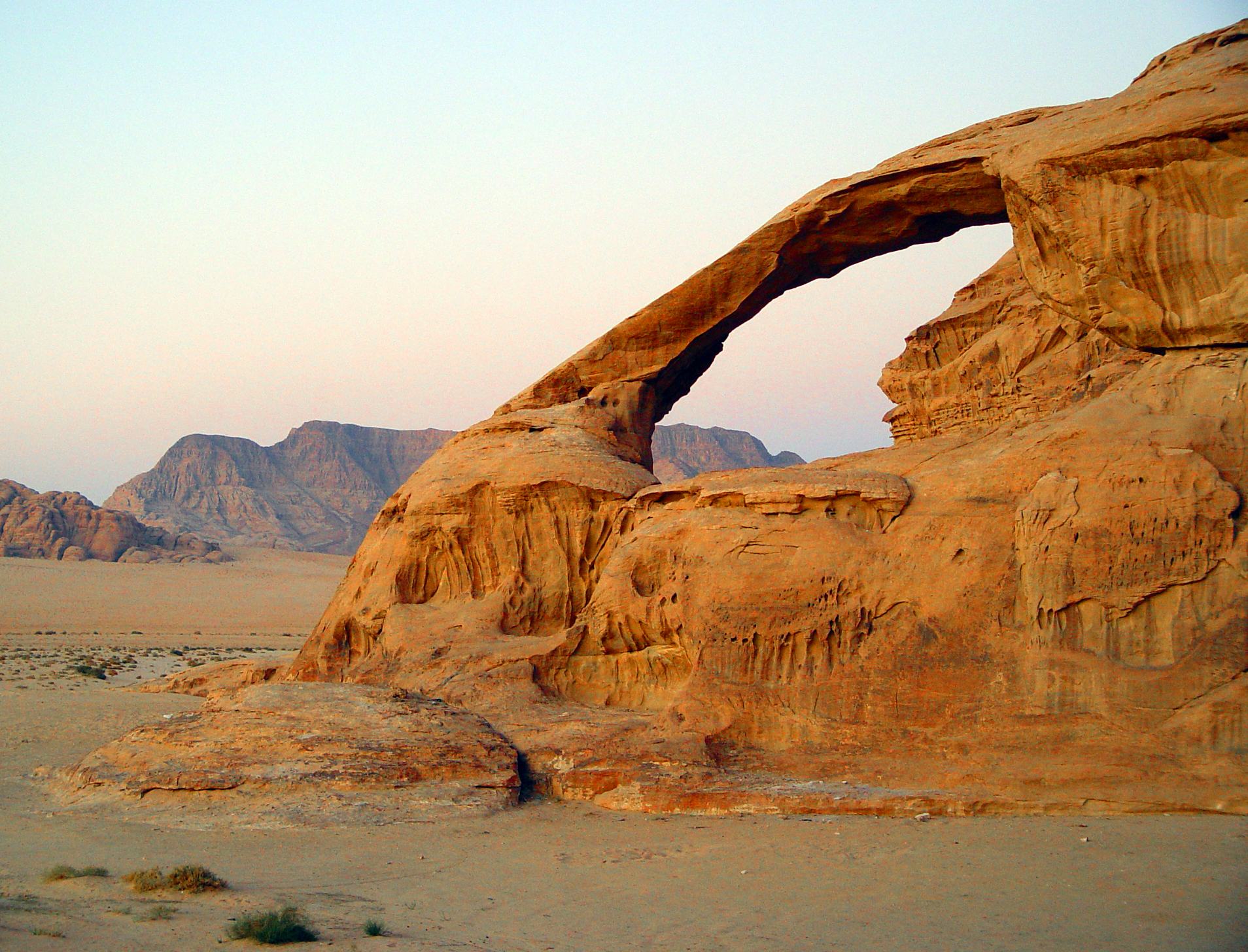
A natural arch produced by the wind erosion of differentially weathered rock in Jebel Kharaz, Jordan

== Physical processes ==
=== Rainfall and surface runoff ===
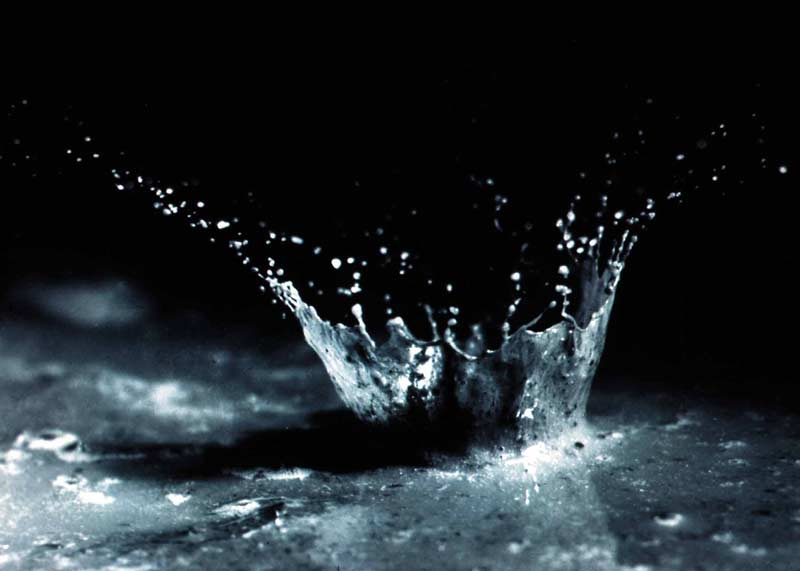
Soil and water being splashed by the impact of a single raindrop

Rainfall, and the surface runoff which may result from rainfall, produces four main types of soil erosion: splash erosion, sheet erosion, rill erosion, and gully erosion. Splash erosion is generally seen as the first and least severe stage in the soil erosion process, which is followed by sheet erosion, then rill erosion and finally gully erosion (the most severe of the four).

In splash erosion, the impact of a falling raindrop creates a small crater in the soil, ejecting soil particles. The distance these soil particles travel can be as much as 0.6 m (2.0 ft) vertically and 1.5 m (4.9 ft) horizontally on level ground.

If the soil is saturated, or if the rainfall rate is greater than the rate at which water can infiltrate into the soil, surface runoff occurs. If the runoff has sufficient flow energy, it will transport loosened soil particles (sediment) down the slope. Sheet erosion is the transport of loosened soil particles by overland flow.

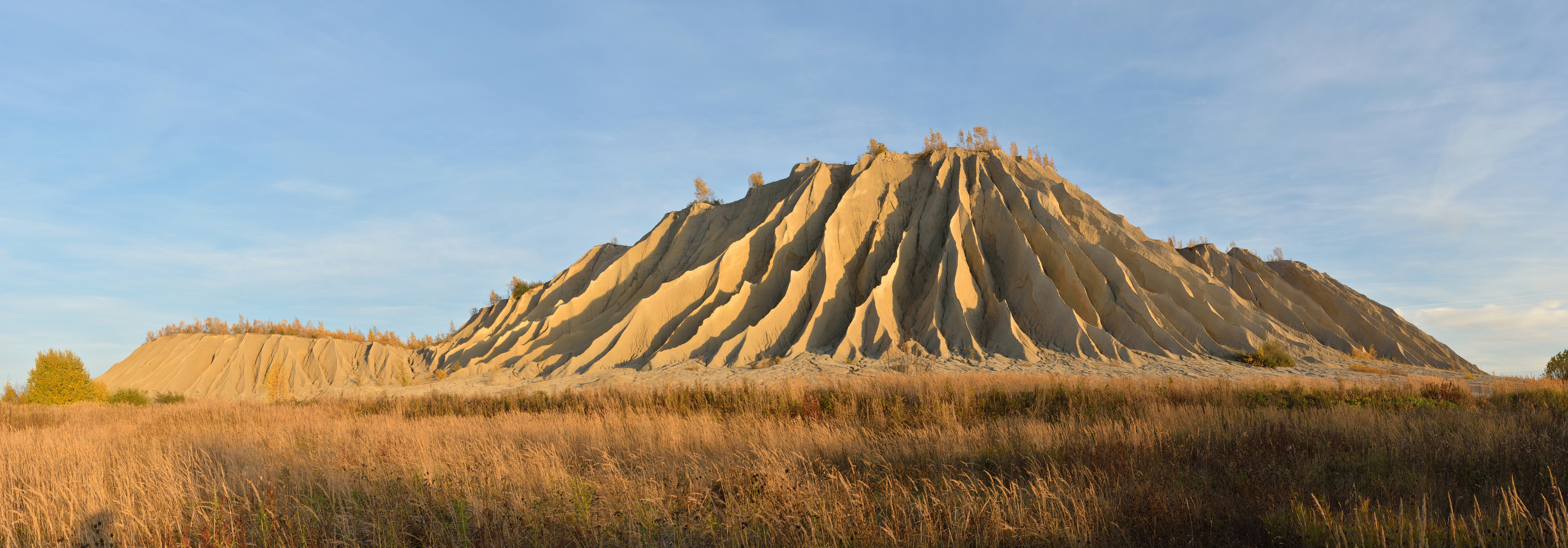
A spoil tip covered in rills and gullies due to erosion processes caused by rainfall: Rummu, Estonia

Rill erosion refers to the development of small, ephemeral concentrated flow paths which function as both sediment source and sediment delivery systems for erosion on hillslopes. Generally, where water erosion rates on disturbed upland areas are greatest, rills are active. Flow depths in rills are typically of the order of a few centimetres (about an inch) or less and along-channel slopes may be quite steep. This means that rills exhibit hydraulic physics very different from water flowing through the deeper, wider channels of streams and rivers.

Gully erosion occurs when runoff water accumulates and rapidly flows in narrow channels during or immediately after heavy rains or melting snow, removing soil to a considerable depth. A gully is distinguished from a rill based on a critical cross-sectional area of at least one square foot, i.e. the size of a channel that can no longer be erased via normal tillage operations.

Extreme gully erosion can progress to formation of badlands. These form under conditions of high relief on easily eroded bedrock in climates favorable to erosion. Conditions or disturbances that limit the growth of protective vegetation (rhexistasy) are a key element of badland formation.

=== Rivers and streams ===
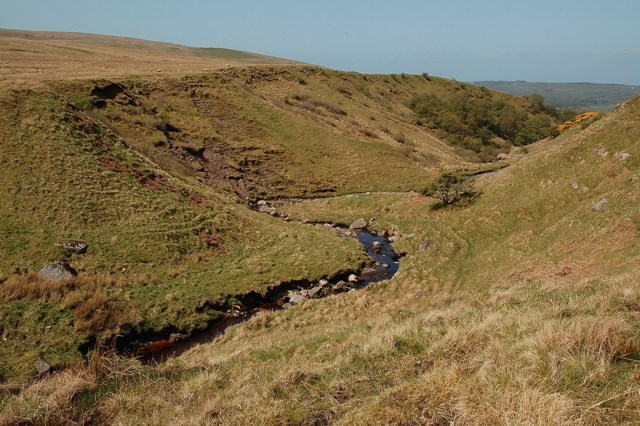
Dobbingstone Burn, Scotland, showing two different types of erosion affecting the same place. Valley erosion is occurring due to the flow of the stream, and the boulders and stones (and much of the soil) that are lying on the stream's banks are glacial till that was left behind as ice age glaciers flowed over the terrain.

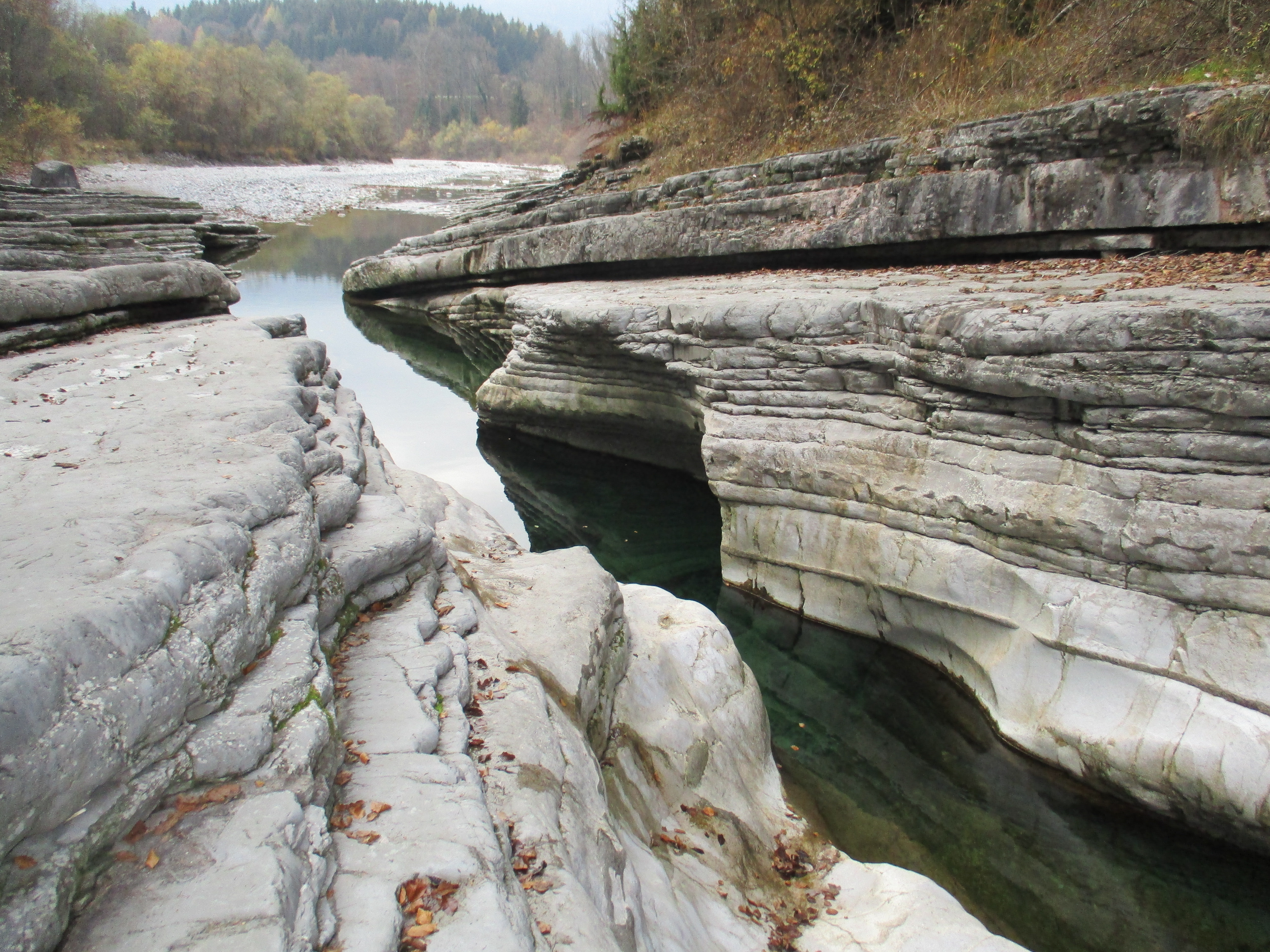
Layers of chalk exposed by a river eroding through them

Valley or stream erosion occurs with continued water flow along a linear feature. The erosion is both downward, deepening the valley, and headward, extending the valley into the hillside, creating head cuts and steep banks. In the earliest stage of stream erosion, the erosive activity is dominantly vertical, the valleys have a typical V-shaped cross-section and the stream gradient is relatively steep. When some base level is reached, the erosive activity switches to lateral erosion, which widens the valley floor and creates a narrow floodplain. The stream gradient becomes nearly flat, and lateral deposition of sediments becomes important as the stream meanders across the valley floor. In all stages of stream erosion, by far the most erosion occurs during times of flood when more and faster-moving water is available to carry a larger sediment load. In such processes, it is not the water alone that erodes: suspended abrasive particles, pebbles, and boulders can also act erosively as they traverse a surface, in a process known as traction.

Bank erosion is the wearing away of the banks of a stream or river. This is distinguished from changes on the bed of the watercourse, which is referred to as scour. Erosion and changes in the form of river banks may be measured by inserting metal rods into the bank and marking the position of the bank surface along the rods at different times.

Thermal erosion is the result of melting and weakening permafrost due to moving water. It can occur both along rivers and at the coast. Rapid river channel migration observed in the Lena River of Siberia is due to thermal erosion, as these portions of the banks are composed of permafrost-cemented non-cohesive materials. Much of this erosion occurs as the weakened banks fail in large slumps. Thermal erosion also affects the Arctic coast, where wave action and near-shore temperatures combine to undercut permafrost bluffs along the shoreline and cause them to fail. Annual erosion rates along a 100-kilometre (62-mile) segment of the Beaufort Sea shoreline averaged 5.6 metres (18 feet) per year from 1955 to 2002.

Most river erosion happens nearer to the mouth of a river. On a river bend, the longest least sharp side has slower moving water. Here deposits build up. On the narrowest sharpest side of the bend, there is faster moving water so this side tends to erode away mostly.

Rapid erosion by a large river can remove enough sediments to produce a river anticline, as isostatic rebound raises rock beds unburdened by erosion of overlying beds.

=== Coastal erosion ===
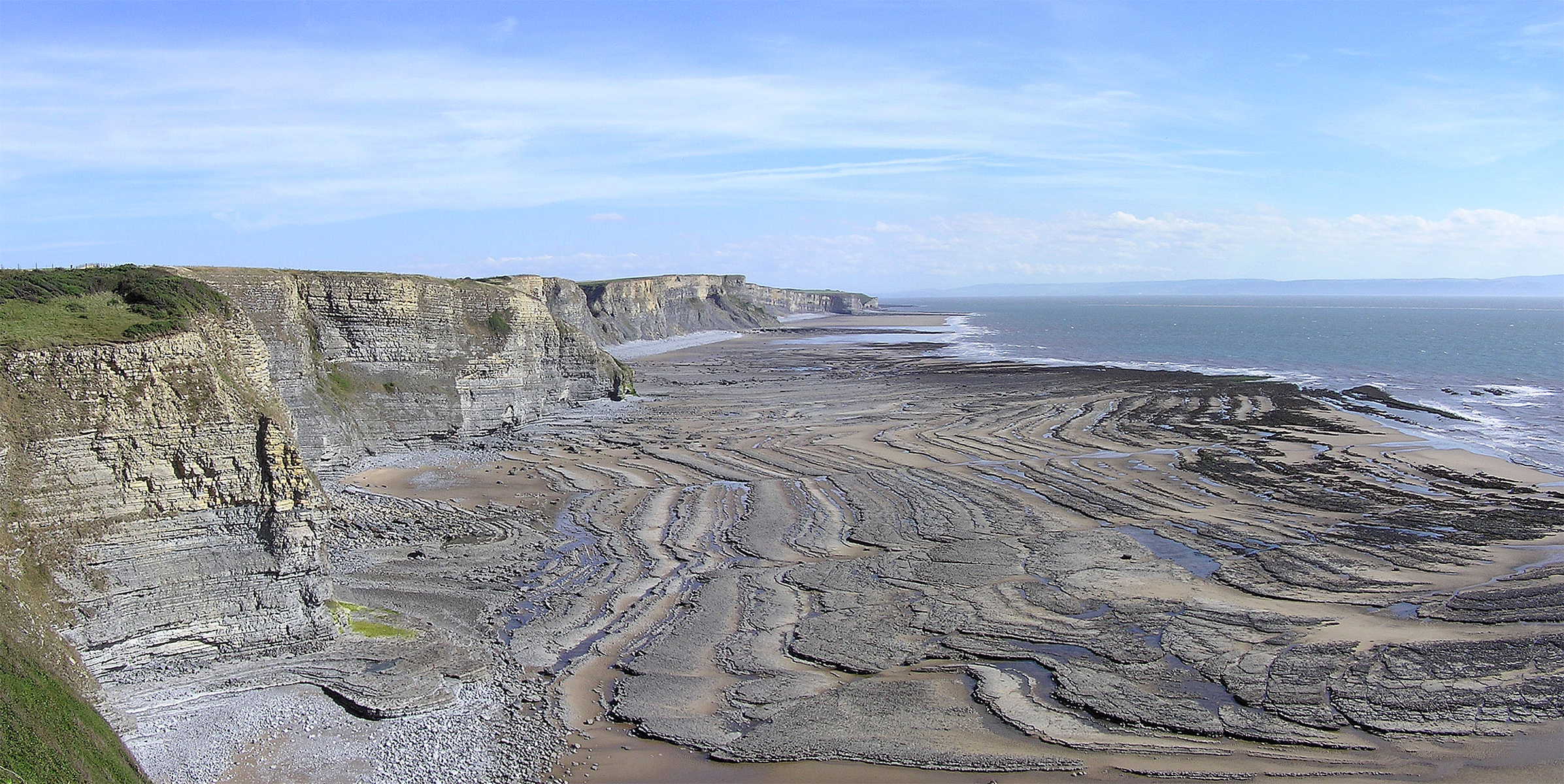
Wave cut platform caused by erosion of cliffs by the sea, at Southerndown in South Wales

Shoreline erosion, which occurs on both exposed and sheltered coasts, primarily occurs through the action of currents and waves but sea level (tidal) change can also play a role.

Sea-dune erosion at Talacre beach, Wales

Hydraulic action takes place when the air in a joint is suddenly compressed by a wave closing the entrance of the joint. This then cracks it. Wave pounding is when the sheer energy of the wave hitting the cliff or rock breaks pieces off. Abrasion or corrasion is caused by waves launching sea load at the cliff. It is the most effective and rapid form of shoreline erosion (not to be confused with corrosion). Corrosion is the dissolving of rock by carbonic acid in sea water. Limestone cliffs are particularly vulnerable to this kind of erosion. Attrition is where particles/sea load carried by the waves are worn down as they hit each other and the cliffs. This then makes the material easier to wash away. The material ends up as shingle and sand. Another significant source of erosion, particularly on carbonate coastlines, is boring, scraping and grinding of organisms, a process termed bioerosion.

Sediment is transported along the coast in the direction of the prevailing current (longshore drift). When the upcurrent supply of sediment is less than the amount being carried away, erosion occurs. When the upcurrent amount of sediment is greater, sand or gravel banks will tend to form as a result of deposition. These banks may slowly migrate along the coast in the direction of the longshore drift, alternately protecting and exposing parts of the coastline. Where there is a bend in the coastline, quite often a buildup of eroded material occurs forming a long narrow bank (a spit). Armoured beaches and submerged offshore sandbanks may also protect parts of a coastline from erosion. Over the years, as the shoals gradually shift, the erosion may be redirected to attack different parts of the shore.

Erosion of a coastal surface, followed by a fall in sea level, can produce a distinctive landform called a raised beach.

=== Chemical erosion ===
Chemical erosion is the loss of matter in a landscape in the form of solutes. Chemical erosion is usually calculated from the solutes found in streams. Anders Rapp pioneered the study of chemical erosion in his work about Kärkevagge published in 1960.

Formation of sinkholes and other features of karst topography is an example of extreme chemical erosion.

=== Glaciers ===
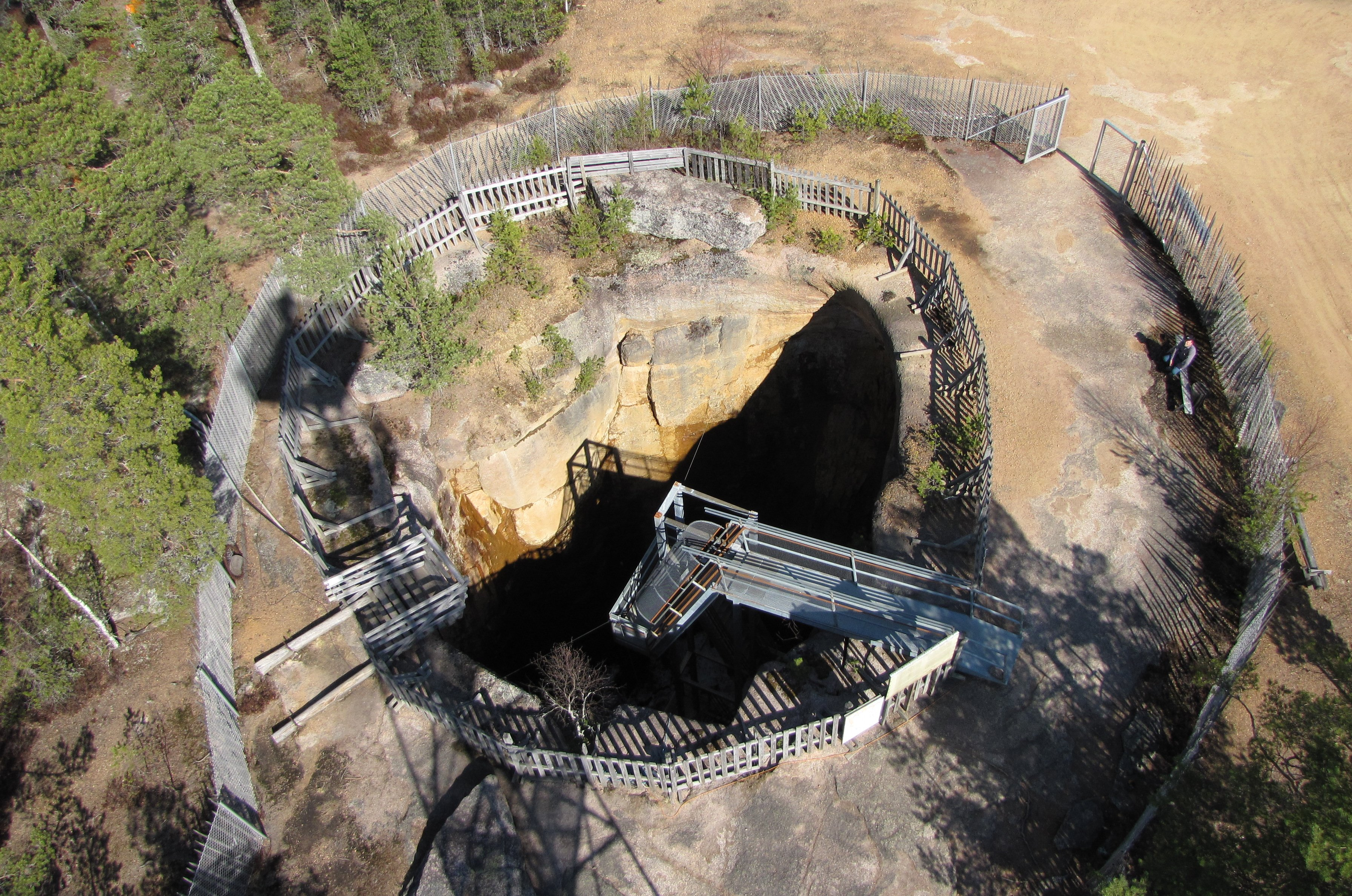
The Devil's Nest (Pirunpesä), the deepest ground erosion in Europe, located in Jalasjärvi, Kurikka, Finland

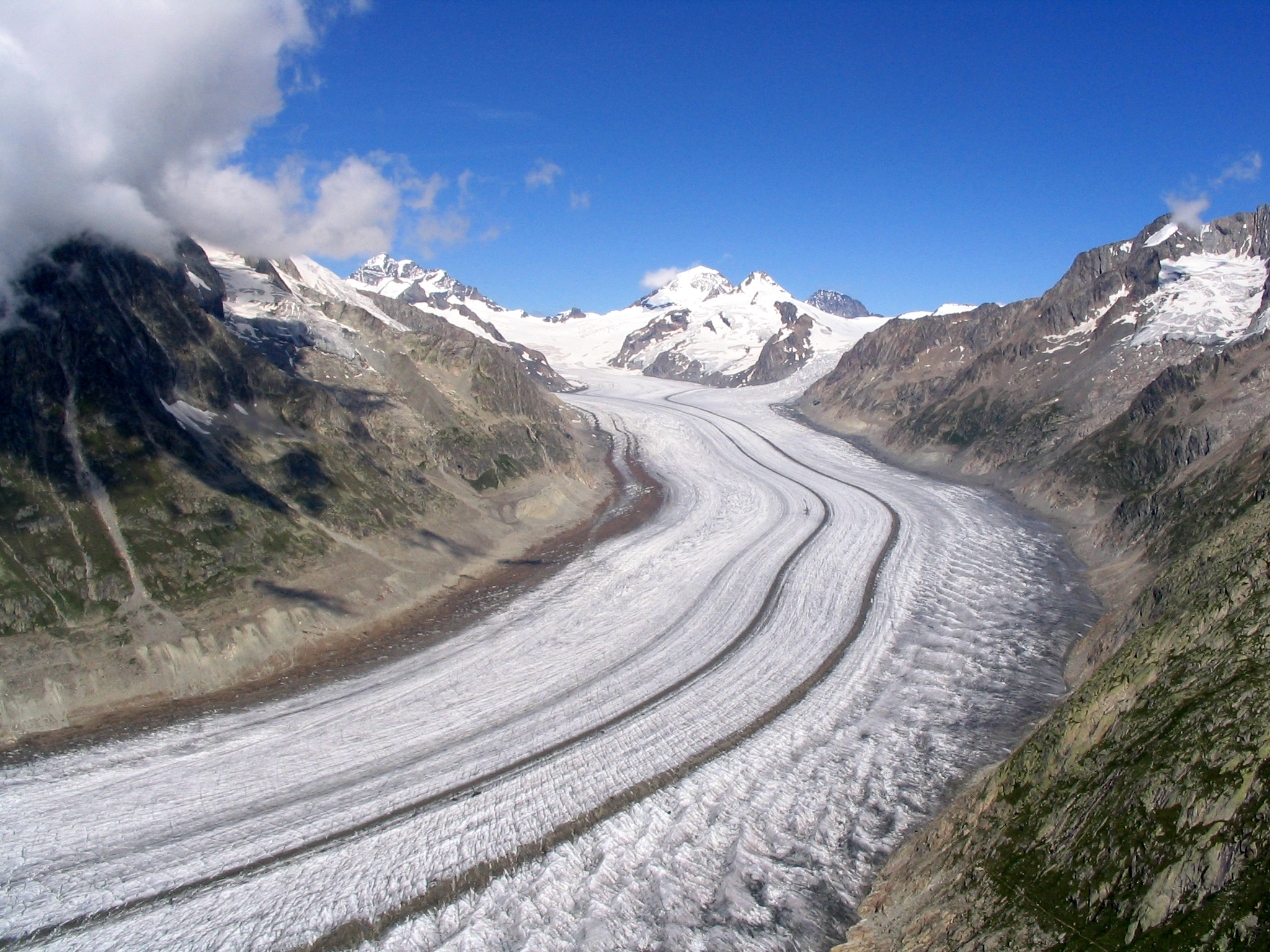
Grosser Aletschgletscher, Bernese Alps, Switzerland

Glaciers erode predominantly by three different processes: abrasion/scouring, plucking, and ice thrusting. In an abrasion process, debris in the basal ice scrapes along the bed, polishing and gouging the underlying rocks, similar to sandpaper on wood. Scientists have shown that, in addition to the role of temperature played in valley-deepening, other glaciological processes, such as erosion also control cross-valley variations. In a homogeneous bedrock erosion pattern, curved channel cross-section beneath the ice is created. Though the glacier continues to incise vertically, the shape of the channel beneath the ice eventually remain constant, reaching a U-shaped parabolic steady-state shape as we now see in glaciated valleys. Scientists also provide a numerical estimate of the time required for the ultimate formation of a steady-shaped U-shaped valley—approximately 100,000 years. In a weak bedrock (containing material more erodible than the surrounding rocks) erosion pattern, on the contrary, the amount of over deepening is limited because ice velocities and erosion rates are reduced.

Glaciers can also cause pieces of bedrock to crack off in the process of plucking. In ice thrusting, the glacier freezes to its bed, then as it surges forward, it moves large sheets of frozen sediment at the base along with the glacier. This method produced some of the many thousands of lake basins that dot the edge of the Canadian Shield. Differences in the height of mountain ranges are not only being the result tectonic forces, such as rock uplift, but also local climate variations. Scientists use global analysis of topography to show that glacial erosion controls the maximum height of mountains, as the relief between mountain peaks and the snow line are generally confined to altitudes less than 1500 m. The erosion caused by glaciers worldwide erodes mountains so effectively that the term glacial buzzsaw has become widely used, which describes the limiting effect of glaciers on the height of mountain ranges. As mountains grow higher, they generally allow for more glacial activity (especially in the accumulation zone above the glacial equilibrium line altitude), which causes increased rates of erosion of the mountain, decreasing mass faster than isostatic rebound can add to the mountain. This provides a good example of a negative feedback loop. Ongoing research is showing that while glaciers tend to decrease mountain size, in some areas, glaciers can actually reduce the rate of erosion, acting as a glacial armor. Ice can not only erode mountains but also protect them from erosion. Depending on glacier regime, even steep alpine lands can be preserved through time with the help of ice. Scientists have proved this theory by sampling eight summits of northwestern Svalbard using Be10 and Al26, showing that northwestern Svalbard transformed from a glacier-erosion state under relatively mild glacial maxima temperature, to a glacier-armor state occupied by cold-based, protective ice during much colder glacial maxima temperatures as the Quaternary ice age progressed.

These processes, combined with erosion and transport by the water network beneath the glacier, leave behind glacial landforms such as moraines, drumlins, ground moraine (till), glaciokarst, kames, kame deltas, moulins, and glacial erratics in their wake, typically at the terminus or during glacier retreat.

The best-developed glacial valley morphology appears to be restricted to landscapes with low rock uplift rates (less than or equal to 2mm per year) and high relief, leading to long-turnover times. Where rock uplift rates exceed 2mm per year, glacial valley morphology has generally been significantly modified in postglacial time. Interplay of glacial erosion and tectonic forcing governs the morphologic impact of glaciations on active orogens, by both influencing their height, and by altering the patterns of erosion during subsequent glacial periods via a link between rock uplift and valley cross-sectional shape.

=== Floods ===
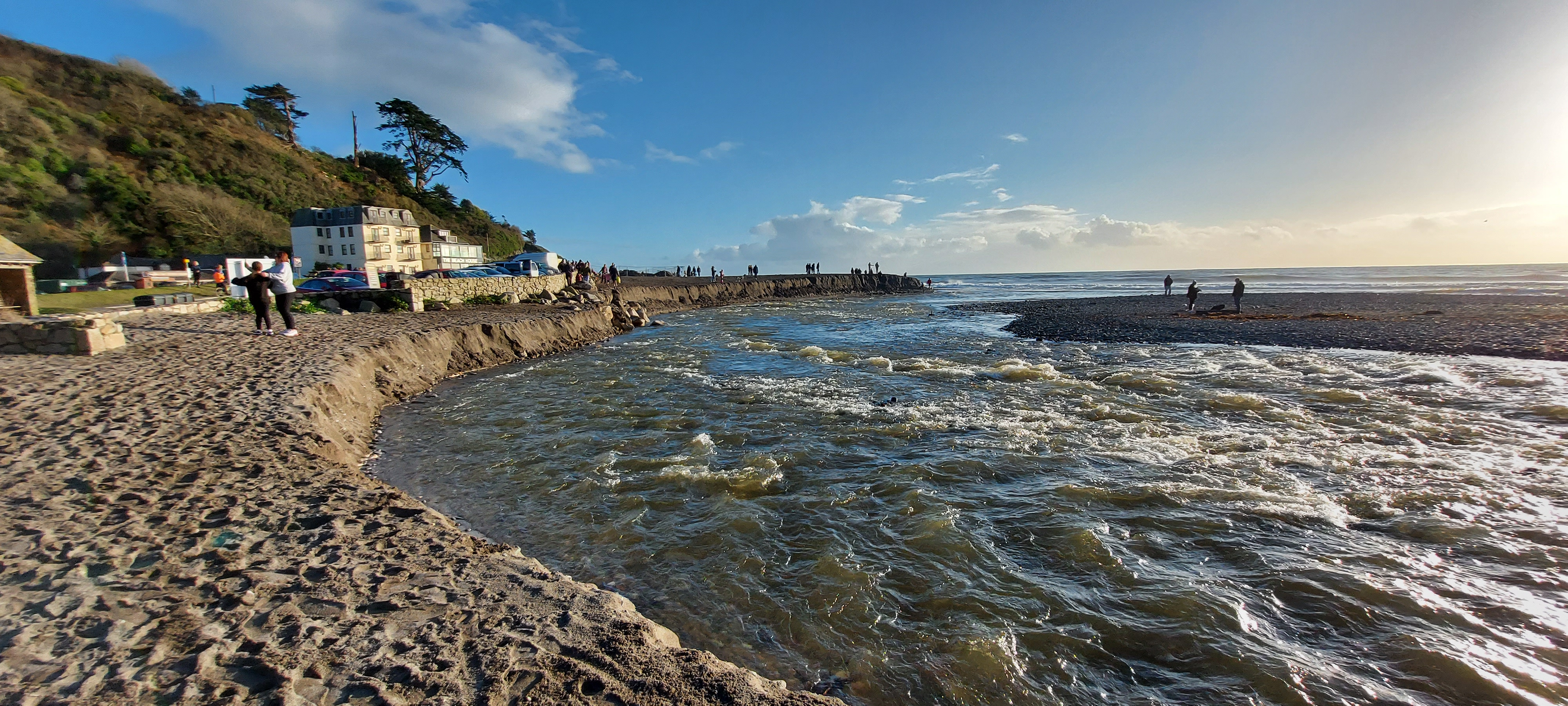
The mouth of the River Seaton in Cornwall after heavy rainfall caused flooding in the area and cause a significant amount of the beach to erode; leaving behind a tall sand bank in its place

At extremely high flows, kolks, or vortices are formed by large volumes of rapidly rushing water. Kolks cause extreme local erosion, plucking bedrock and creating pothole-type geographical features called rock-cut basins. Examples can be seen in the flood regions result from glacial Lake Missoula, which created the channeled scablands in the Columbia Basin region of eastern Washington.

=== Wind erosion ===
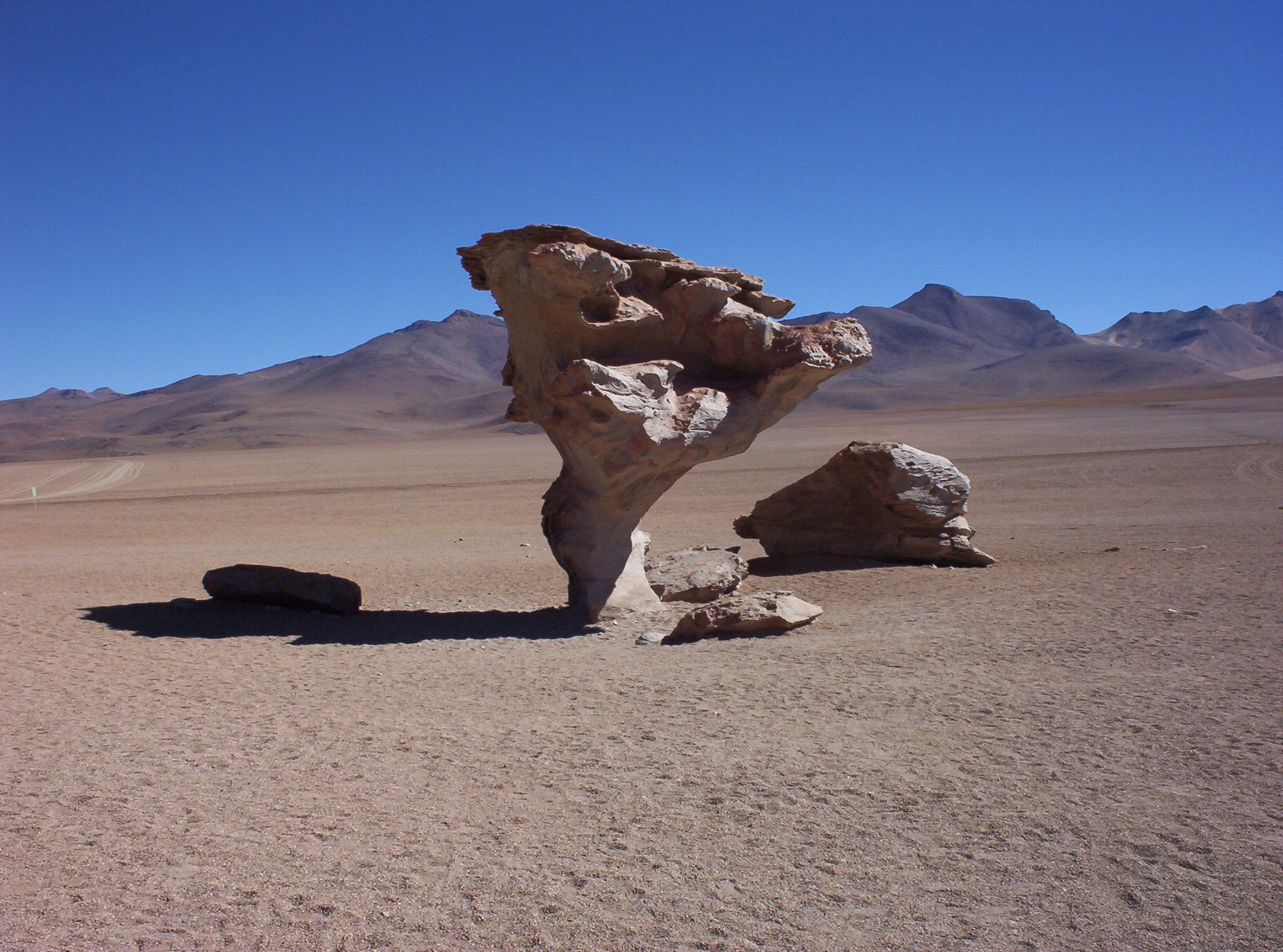
Árbol de Piedra, a rock formation in the Altiplano, Bolivia sculpted by wind erosion

Wind erosion is a major geomorphological force, especially in arid and semi-arid regions. It is also a major source of land degradation, evaporation, desertification, harmful airborne dust, and crop damage—especially after being increased far above natural rates by human activities such as deforestation, urbanization, and agriculture.

Wind erosion is of two primary varieties: deflation, where the wind picks up and carries away loose particles; and abrasion, where surfaces are worn down as they are struck by airborne particles carried by wind. Deflation is divided into three categories: (1) surface creep, where larger, heavier particles slide or roll along the ground; (2) saltation, where particles are lifted a short height into the air, and bounce and saltate across the surface of the soil; and (3) suspension, where very small and light particles are lifted into the air by the wind, and are often carried for long distances. Saltation is responsible for the majority (50–70%) of wind erosion, followed by suspension (30–40%), and then surface creep (5–25%).

Wind erosion is much more severe in arid areas and during times of drought. For example, in the Great Plains, it is estimated that soil loss due to wind erosion can be as much as 6100 times greater in drought years than in wet years.

=== Mass wasting ===
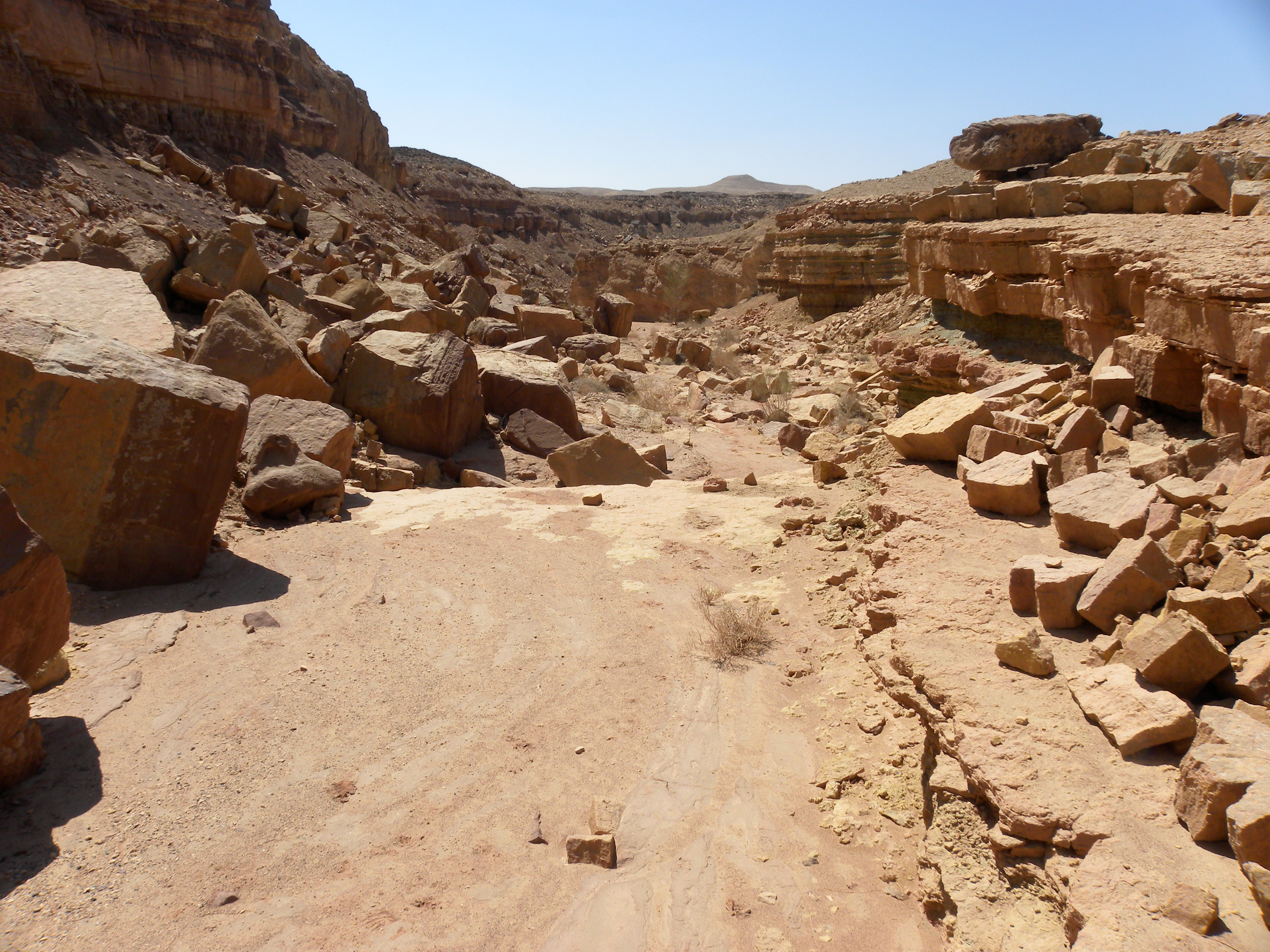
A wadi in Makhtesh Ramon, Israel, showing gravity collapse erosion on its banks

Mass wasting or mass movement is the downward and outward movement of rock and sediments on a sloped surface, mainly due to the force of gravity.

Mass wasting is an important part of the erosional process and is often the first stage in the breakdown and transport of weathered materials in mountainous areas. It moves material from higher elevations to lower elevations where other eroding agents such as streams and glaciers can then pick up the material and move it to even lower elevations. Mass-wasting processes are always occurring continuously on all slopes; some mass-wasting processes act very slowly; others occur very suddenly, often with disastrous results. Any perceptible down-slope movement of rock or sediment is often referred to in general terms as a landslide. However, landslides can be classified in a much more detailed way that reflects the mechanisms responsible for the movement and the velocity at which the movement occurs. One of the visible topographical manifestations of rapid rockfall activity is a scree slope, which consists of accumulated loose rock debris at the base of cliffs or steep slopes.

Slumping happens on steep hillsides, occurring along distinct fracture zones, often within materials like clay that, once released, may move quite rapidly downhill. They will often show a spoon-shaped isostatic depression, in which the material has begun to slide downhill. In some cases, the slump is caused by water beneath the slope weakening it. In many cases it is simply the result of poor engineering along highways where it is a regular occurrence.

Surface creep is the slow movement of soil and rock debris by gravity which is usually not perceptible except through extended observation. However, the term can also describe the rolling of dislodged soil particles 0.5 to 1.0 mm (0.02 to 0.04 in) in diameter by wind along the soil surface.

=== Submarine sediment gravity flows ===
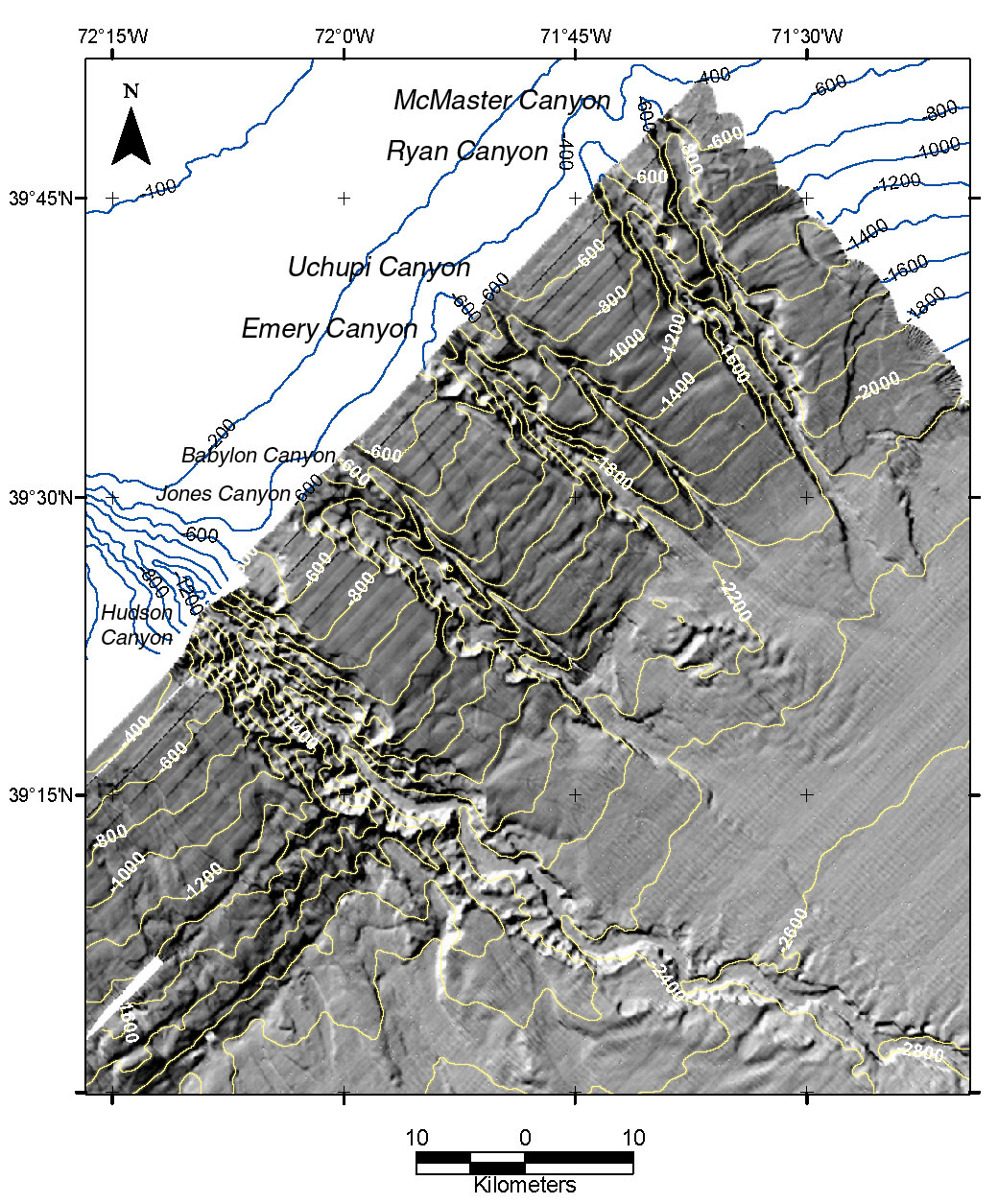
Bathymetry of submarine canyons in the continental slope off the coast of New York and New Jersey

On the continental slope, erosion of the ocean floor to create channels and submarine canyons can result from the rapid downslope flow of sediment gravity flows, bodies of sediment-laden water that move rapidly downslope as turbidity currents. Where erosion by turbidity currents creates oversteepened slopes it can also trigger underwater landslides and debris flows. Turbidity currents can erode channels and canyons into substrates ranging from recently deposited unconsolidated sediments to hard crystalline bedrock. Almost all continental slopes and deep ocean basins display such channels and canyons resulting from sediment gravity flows and submarine canyons act as conduits for the transfer of sediment from the continents and shallow marine environments to the deep sea. Turbidites, which are the sedimentary deposits resulting from turbidity currents, comprise some of the thickest and largest sedimentary sequences on Earth, indicating that the associated erosional processes must also have played a prominent role in Earth's history.

== Factors affecting erosion rates ==
=== Climate ===
The amount and intensity of precipitation is the main climatic factor governing soil erosion by water. The relationship is particularly strong if heavy rainfall occurs at times when, or in locations where, the soil's surface is not well protected by vegetation. This might be during periods when agricultural activities leave the soil bare, or in semi-arid regions where vegetation is naturally sparse. Wind erosion requires strong winds, particularly during times of drought when vegetation is sparse and soil is dry (and so is more erodible). Other climatic factors such as average temperature and temperature range may also affect erosion, via their effects on vegetation and soil properties. In general, given similar vegetation and ecosystems, areas with more precipitation (especially high-intensity rainfall), more wind, or more storms are expected to have more erosion.

In some areas of the world (e.g. the mid-western US), rainfall intensity is the primary determinant of erosivity (for a definition of erosivity check,) with higher intensity rainfall generally resulting in more soil erosion by water. The size and velocity of rain drops is also an important factor. Larger and higher-velocity rain drops have greater kinetic energy, and thus their impact will displace soil particles by larger distances than smaller, slower-moving rain drops.

In other regions of the world (e.g. western Europe), runoff and erosion result from relatively low intensities of stratiform rainfall falling onto the previously saturated soil. In such situations, rainfall amount rather than intensity is the main factor determining the severity of soil erosion by water. According to the climate change projections, erosivity will increase significantly in Europe and soil erosion may increase by 13–22.5% by 2050

In Taiwan, where typhoon frequency increased significantly in the 21st century, a strong link has been drawn between the increase in storm frequency with an increase in sediment load in rivers and reservoirs, highlighting the impacts climate change can have on erosion.

=== Vegetative cover ===
Vegetation acts as an interface between the atmosphere and the soil. It increases the permeability of the soil to rainwater, thus decreasing runoff. It shelters the soil from winds, which results in decreased wind erosion, as well as advantageous changes in microclimate. The roots of the plants bind the soil together, and interweave with other roots, forming a more solid mass that is less susceptible to both water and wind erosion. The removal of vegetation increases the rate of surface erosion.

=== Topography ===
The topography of the land determines the velocity at which surface runoff will flow, which in turn determines the erosivity of the runoff. Longer, steeper slopes (especially those without adequate vegetative cover) are more susceptible to very high rates of erosion during heavy rains than shorter, less steep slopes. Steeper terrain is also more prone to mudslides, landslides, and other forms of gravitational erosion processes.

=== Tectonics ===
Tectonic processes control rates and distributions of erosion at the Earth's surface. If the tectonic action causes part of the Earth's surface (e.g., a mountain range) to be raised or lowered relative to surrounding areas, this must necessarily change the gradient of the land surface. Because erosion rates are almost always sensitive to the local slope (see above), this will change the rates of erosion in the uplifted area. Active tectonics also brings fresh, unweathered rock towards the surface, where it is exposed to the action of erosion.

However, erosion can also affect tectonic processes. The removal by erosion of large amounts of rock from a particular region, and its deposition elsewhere, can result in a lightening of the load on the lower crust and mantle. Because tectonic processes are driven by gradients in the stress field developed in the crust, this unloading can in turn cause tectonic or isostatic uplift in the region. In some cases, it has been hypothesised that these twin feedbacks can act to localize and enhance zones of very rapid exhumation of deep crustal rocks beneath places on the Earth's surface with extremely high erosion rates, for example, beneath the extremely steep terrain of Nanga Parbat in the western Himalayas. Such a place has been called a "tectonic aneurysm".

=== Development ===
Human land development, in forms including agricultural and urban development, is considered a significant factor in erosion and sediment transport, which aggravate food insecurity. In Taiwan, increases in sediment load in the northern, central, and southern regions of the island can be tracked with the timeline of development for each region throughout the 20th century. The intentional removal of soil and rock by humans is a form of erosion that has been named lisasion.

== Erosion at various scales ==
=== Mountain ranges ===
Mountain ranges take millions of years to erode to the degree they effectively cease to exist. Scholars Pitman and Golovchenko estimate that it takes probably more than 450 million years to erode a mountain mass similar to the Himalaya into an almost-flat peneplain if there are no significant sea-level changes. Erosion of mountains massifs can create a pattern of equally high summits called summit accordance. It has been argued that extension during post-orogenic collapse is a more effective mechanism of lowering the height of orogenic mountains than erosion.

Examples of heavily eroded mountain ranges include the Timanides of Northern Russia. Erosion of this orogen has produced sediments that are now found in the East European Platform, including the Cambrian Sablya Formation near Lake Ladoga. Studies of these sediments indicate that it is likely that the erosion of the orogen began in the Cambrian and then intensified in the Ordovician.

=== Soils ===
If the erosion rate exceeds soil formation, erosion destroys the soil. Lower rates of erosion can prevent the formation of soil features that take time to develop. Inceptisols develop on eroded landscapes that, if stable, would have supported the formation of more developed Alfisols.

While erosion of soils is a natural process, human activities have increased by 10–40 times the rate at which erosion occurs globally. Excessive (or accelerated) erosion causes both "on-site" and "off-site" problems. On-site impacts include decreases in agricultural productivity and (on natural landscapes) ecological collapse, both because of loss of the nutrient-rich upper soil layers. In some cases, the eventual result is desertification. Off-site effects include sedimentation of waterways and eutrophication of water bodies, as well as sediment-related damage to roads and houses. Water and wind erosion are the two primary causes of land degradation; combined, they are responsible for about 84% of the global extent of degraded land, making excessive erosion one of the most significant environmental problems.

Often in the United States, farmers cultivating highly erodible land must comply with a conservation plan to be eligible for agricultural assistance.

== See also ==
- Bridge scour – Erosion of sediment near bridge foundations by water
- Cellular confinement – Confinement system used in construction and geotechnical engineering
- Colluvium – Loose, unconsolidated sediments deposited at the base of a hillslope
- Groundwater sapping – Geomorphic erosion process
- Lessivage
- Space weathering – Type of weathering
- Vetiver System – System of soil and water conservation
