= Koskue =

Village in Finland

Coordinates: 62°21′N 22°51′E

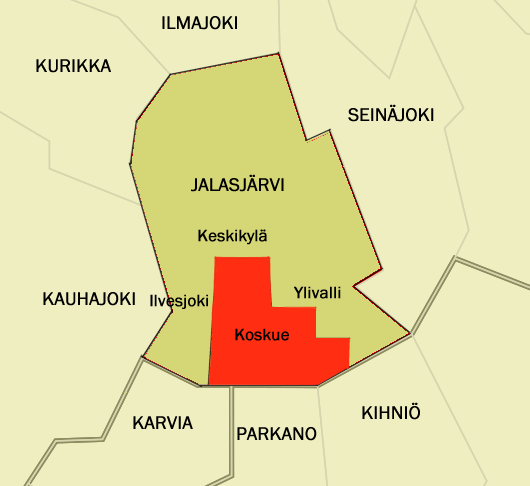
Location of Koskue in Jalasjärvi

Koskue (Finnish: [ˈkoskue̯]) is a village in Jalasjärvi, South Ostrobothnia, Finland. In 2007, it had a population of 850.
