= Wave pounding =

Wave pounding is the 'sledge hammer' effect of tonnes of water crashing against cliffs. It shakes and weakens the rocks leaving them open to attack from hydraulic action and abrasion. Eroded material gets carried away by the wave. Wave pounding is particularly fierce in a storm, where the waves are exceptionally large, and have a lot of energy. It is an important engineering consideration in the construction of structures such as seawalls and dams.

Wave pounding is a force of erosion along coast lines. The effects of wave pounding are influenced by wave shape, ocean chemistry, rock type, and morphology of the coastal landscape. There are three different types of waves to consider in this process: spilling, plunging, and surging waves. Spilling waves have the least amount of energy associated with them due to their shallow ocean floor. Plunging and surging waves contain the energy associated with wave pounding. Plunging and surging waves occur on moderate to steep angled beach plains.

Along with energy, the water chemistry will also affect the rock exposed to the erosion. Salt, calcium, and acid levels in the ocean have adverse effects on specific rock types. The chemical weathering due to wave processes is part of why wave pounding is so damaging. Wave pounding is not primarily caused by tectonic margins. Wave pounding will occur any place around the world as long as the angle of the beach plain is steep enough to generate the plunging and surging waves. The action of wave pounding is the kinetic energy delivered by waves fracturing or removing rock and or sand from land sea margins. Any solid material not fully removed by this action will be hydraulically fractured as well. The surging water fills the existing cracks and physically wedges the rock apart. One specific rock is particularly susceptible to the hydraulic action.

Chert rock, or any other rock which has fractured and has had siliceous material fill in the cracks, seems to be very weak to wave action. The water can get into the bubbles and voids in the quartz fracture lines. Some beaches in northern California have broken cliff side with these same fracture patterns on the break line. Some shorelines with wave pounding have large sand deposits and loosely consolidated sand cliffs. Waves in these areas can be extra damaging due to the suspended sand material in the water. These sand cliff faces do not fracture in the same way that solid rock will.

Examples on the northern California coast line suggest that the water erodes the weakest veins of sand on the cliff face. This effectively carves out notches and weak points of the cliff leaving a large scale of sandstone ready to fall. A sandy cliff with wave pounding action present will appear as a large sand cliff with deep grooves carved laterally and slumped scales of sand mounding on the bottom edge of the cliff. Wave pounding can be a seasonal event or even a daily event depending on the beach. Specific beaches around the world have seasonal changes in the beach angle due to long shore sand drift patterns. These phenomena will affect the strength that a wave will hit the cliff face.

The rise and fall of tides also can mean the difference between a wave spilling onto the beach surface rather than into the cliff face. Wave pounding will affect most jetties and man made outcrops as well. The title of the wave will be different due to the depth of the water at the specific location. The waves do possess the power to damage or move stone on jetties. The steep edges of the jetties allow the waves to crash onto the rock.
