= Jalasjärvi =

- Former municipality
- Jalasjärven kunta Jalasjärvi kommun
- Coat of arms

- Location of Jalasjärvi in Finland
- Coordinates: 62°29.5′N 022°46′E
- Country: Finland
- Region: South Ostrobothnia
- Sub-region: Seinäjoki sub-region
- Charter: 1867
- Consolidated: 2016

Government
  - Municipal manager: Juha Luukko

Area
  - Total: 830.39 km^{2} (320.62 sq mi)
  - Land: 818.70 km^{2} (316.10 sq mi)
  - Water: 11.69 km^{2} (4.51 sq mi)

Population (2015-06-30)
  - Total: 7,834
  - Density: 9.569/km^{2} (24.78/sq mi)
- Time zone: UTC+2 (EET)
  - Summer (DST): UTC+3 (EEST)
- Website: www.jalasjarvi.fi

Jalasjärvi (Finnish: [ˈjɑlɑsˌjærʋi]) is a former municipality of Finland. It was merged to the town of Kurikka on 1 January 2016.

It is located in the province of Western Finland and is part of the South Ostrobothnia region. The population of Jalasjärvi was 7,834 (30 June 2015) and covered a land area of 818.70 km^{2} (316.10 sq mi). The population density was 9.5688/km^{2} (24.7832/sq mi).

The municipality was unilingually Finnish.

== Villages ==
Alavalli, Hirvijärvi, Ilvesjoki, Jalasjärvi, Jokipii, Keskikylä, Koskue, Luopajärvi, Sikakylä, Taivalmaa and Ylivalli.

== Sights ==
- The Devil's Nest, the deepest ground erosion in Europe
- The Local Heritage Museum of Jalasjärvi, one of the largest local museums in Finland, consisting of over 25 rural buildings and a collection of exhibits approaching nearly 30,000 items in total
