= Tectonics =

Process of evolution of Earth's crust

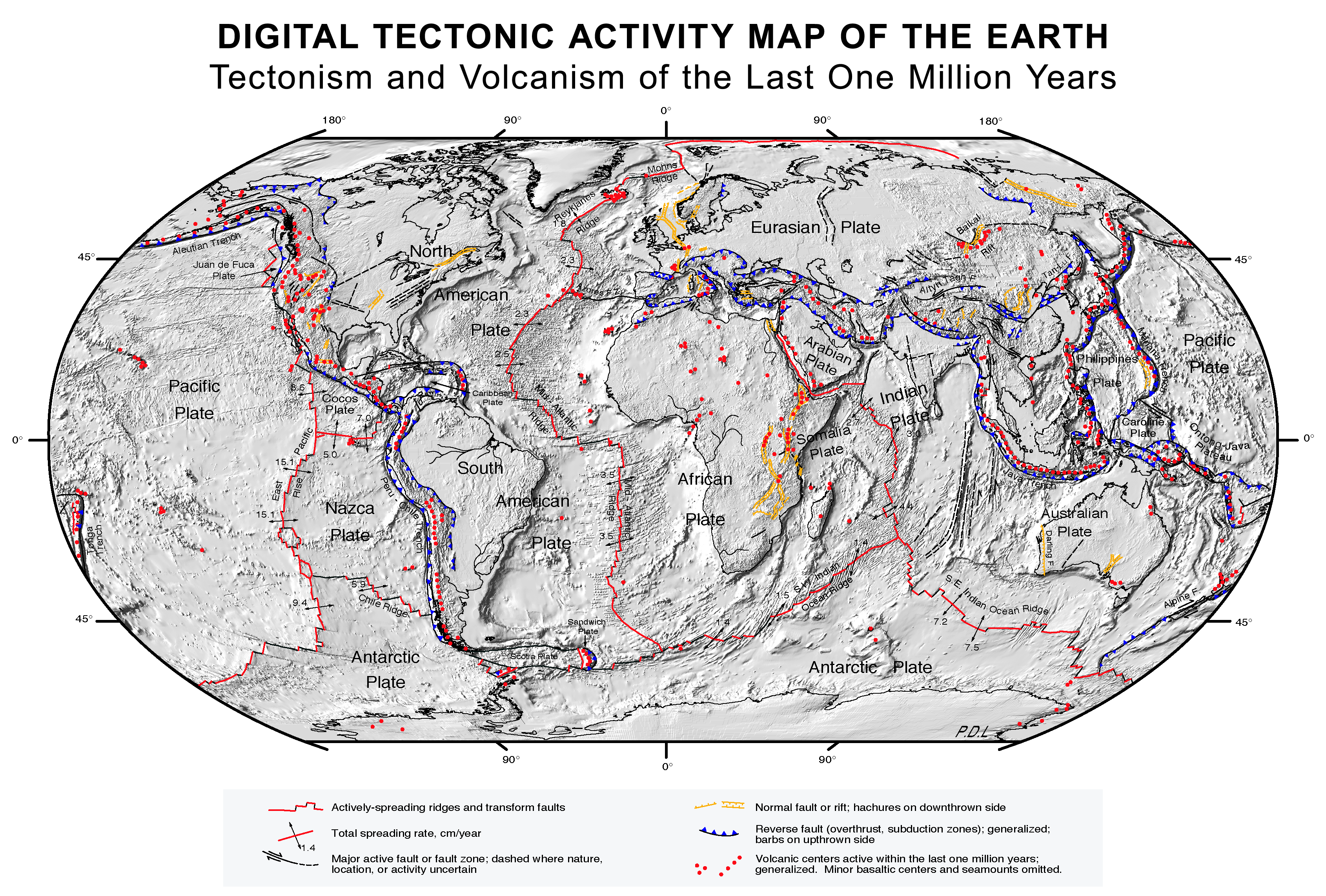

Tectonics (from Ancient Greek τεκτονικός tektonikós 'pertaining to building' via Latin tectonicus) are the processes that result in the structure and properties of Earth's crust and its evolution through time. The field of planetary tectonics extends the concept to other planets and moons.

These processes include those of mountain-building, the growth and behavior of the strong, old cores of continents known as cratons, and the ways in which the relatively rigid plates that constitute Earth's outer shell interact with each other. Principles of tectonics also provide a framework for understanding the earthquake and volcanic belts that directly affect much of the global population.

Tectonic studies are important as guides for economic geologists searching for fossil fuels and ore deposits of metallic and nonmetallic resources. The understanding of tectonic principles can help geomorphologists to explain erosion patterns and other Earth-surface features.

== Main types of tectonic regime ==
=== Extensional tectonics ===
Extensional tectonics is associated with the stretching and thinning of the crust or the lithosphere. This type of tectonics is found at divergent plate boundaries, in continental rifts, during and after a period of continental collision caused by the lateral spreading of the thickened crust formed, at releasing bends in strike-slip faults, in back-arc basins, and on the continental end of passive margin sequences where a detachment layer is present.

=== Thrust (contractional) tectonics ===
Thrust tectonics is associated with the shortening and thickening of the crust, or the lithosphere. This type of tectonics is found at zones of continental collision, at restraining bends in strike-slip faults, and at the oceanward part of passive margin sequences where a detachment layer is present.

=== Strike-slip tectonics ===
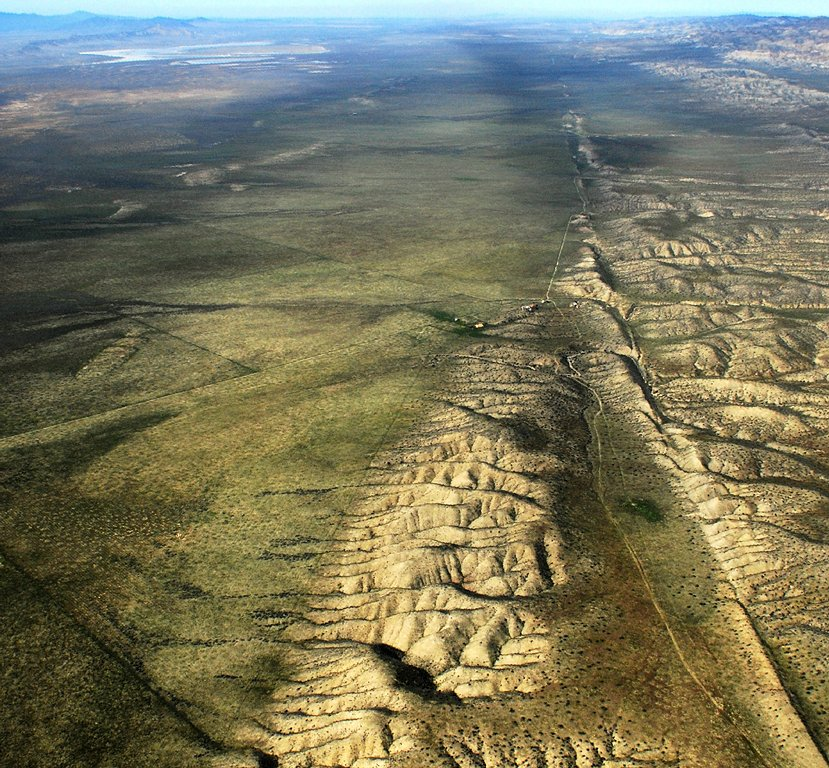
San Andreas transform fault on the Carrizo Plain

Strike-slip tectonics is associated with the relative lateral movement of parts of the crust or the lithosphere. This type of tectonics is found along oceanic and continental transform faults which connect offset segments of mid-ocean ridges. Strike-slip tectonics also occurs at lateral offsets in extensional and thrust fault systems. In areas involved with plate collisions strike-slip deformation occurs in the over-riding plate in zones of oblique collision and accommodates deformation in the foreland to a collisional belt.

== Plate tectonics ==
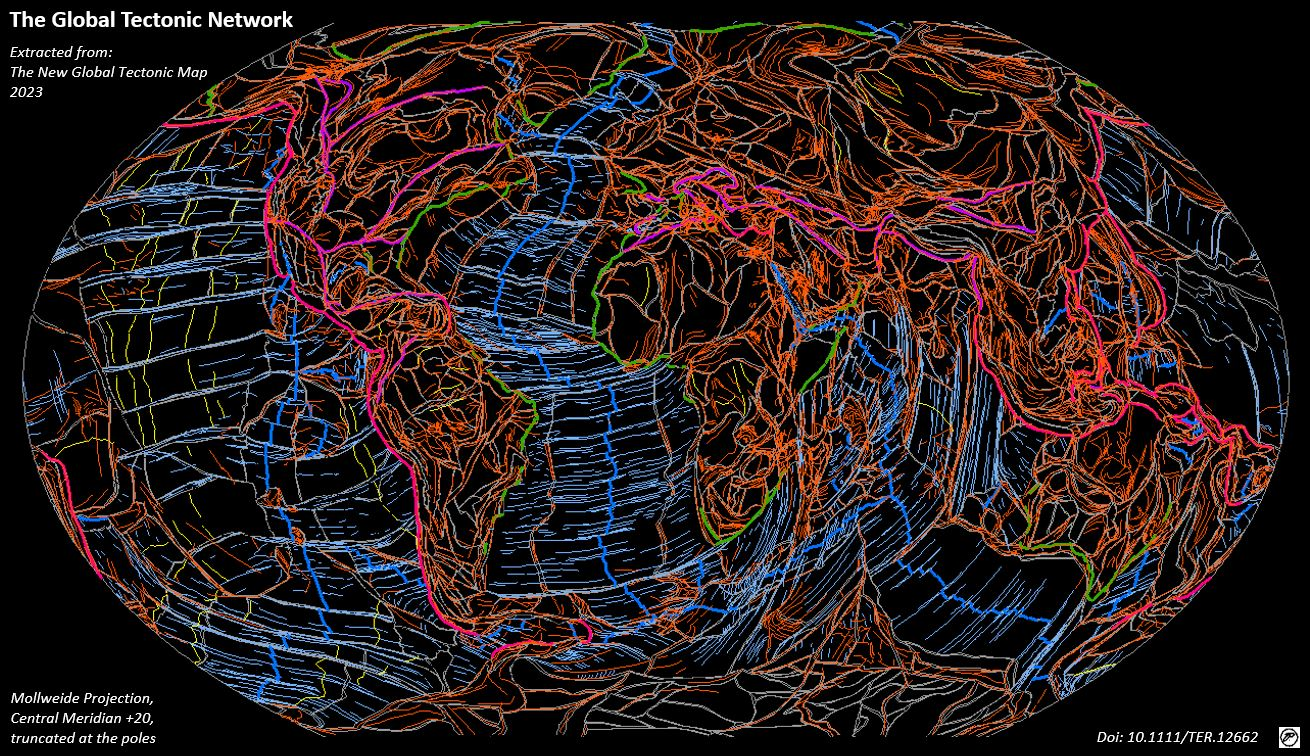
The Tectonic Network of Earth. Legend: Brown: Terrane (microplate) boundaries in the continents and Mobile Belts, Cyan: Terranes of the Oceanic Plates, Blue: Oceanic transform faults; Red and orange: Fault zones in the Continental and Mountain belt domain; Purple: Main subduction zones and suture zones; Green: Continental margins

In plate tectonics, the outermost part of Earth known as the lithosphere (the crust and uppermost mantle) act as a single mechanical layer. The lithosphere is divided into separate "plates" that move relative to each other on the underlying, relatively weak asthenosphere in a process ultimately driven by the continuous loss of heat from Earth's interior. There are three main types of plate boundaries: divergent, where plates move apart from each other and new lithosphere is formed in the process of sea-floor spreading; transform, where plates slide past each other, and convergent, where plates converge and lithosphere is "consumed" by the process of subduction. Convergent and transform boundaries are responsible for most of the world's major (M_{w} > 7) earthquakes. Convergent and divergent boundaries are also the site of most of the world's volcanoes, such as around the Pacific Ring of Fire. Most of the deformation in the lithosphere is related to the interaction between plates at or near plate boundaries. The latest studies, based on the integration of available geological data, and satellite imagery and Gravimetric and magnetic anomaly datasets have shown that the crust of Earth is dissected by thousands of different types of tectonic elements which define the subdivision into numerous smaller microplates which have amalgamated into the larger Plates.

== Other fields of tectonic studies ==
=== Salt tectonics ===
Salt tectonics is concerned with the structural geometries and deformation processes associated with the presence of significant thicknesses of rock salt within a sequence of rocks. This is due both to the low density of salt, which does not increase with burial, and its low strength.

=== Neotectonics ===
Neotectonics is the study of the motions and deformations of Earth's crust (geological and geomorphological processes) that are current or recent in geological time. The term may also refer to the motions and deformations themselves. The corresponding time frame is referred to as the neotectonic period. Accordingly, the preceding time is referred to as palaeotectonic period.

=== Tectonophysics ===
Tectonophysics is the study of the physical processes associated with deformation of the crust and mantle from the scale of individual mineral grains up to that of tectonic plates.

=== Seismotectonics ===
Seismotectonics is the study of the relationship between earthquakes, active tectonics, and individual faults in a region. It seeks to understand which faults are responsible for seismic activity in an area by analysing a combination of regional tectonics, recent instrumentally recorded events, accounts of historical earthquakes, and geomorphological evidence. This information can then be used to quantify the seismic hazard of an area.

=== Impact tectonics ===
Impact tectonics is the study of modification of the lithosphere through high velocity impact cratering events.

=== Planetary tectonics ===
Techniques used in the analysis of tectonics on Earth have also been applied to the study of the planets and their moons, especially icy moons.

== See also ==
- Glarus thrust (UNESCO World Heritage Site)
- Mohorovičić discontinuity
- Seismology
- Tectonophysics
- Volcanology
