= Lisasion =

Form of erosion

Lisasion is a form of erosion where the earth is eroded by intentional human action.

Lisasion is described by Michael Selby in his book Earth's changing surface: an introduction to geomorphology as "the erosion of land, most commonly along rivers and coastlines, by intentional human action." Lisasion only applies to intentional human action, whereby humans deliberately erode the landscape for reasons including for recreation, hazard management and all forms of construction and demolition.
