= River anticline =

A river anticline is a geologic structure that is formed by the focused uplift of rock caused by high erosion rates from large rivers relative to the surrounding areas. An anticline is a fold that is concave down, whose limbs are dipping away from its axis, and whose oldest units are in the middle of the fold. These features form in a number of structural settings. In the case of river anticlines, they form due to high erosion rates, usually in orogenic settings. In a mountain building setting, like that of the Himalaya or the Andes, erosion rates are high and the river anticline's fold axis will trend parallel to a major river. When river anticlines form, they have a zone of uplift between 50-80 kilometers wide along the rivers that form them.

== Cause and effect ==
The type of geologic feature that will form is caused by stream power and flexural rigidity of the crust. When stream power increases and flexural rigidity decreases, this causes the structure to progress from a transverse anticline to a river anticline, and in extreme cases to a tectonic aneurysm. Transverse anticlines trend in the direction of and form around small rivers with relatively high crustal strength. River anticlines form around large highly erosive rivers where crustal strength is relatively low. Tectonic aneurysms will form when erosion is very high and the crust is very weak, to form a structural welt.

The way that river anticlines form via deep river incisions and the associated crustal rebound, cause rocks deep in the crust to be preferentially exhumed along large rivers like the Arun, Indus, Sutlej, and Yarlung Zangbo River. Isolated exhumation causes high pressure and ultra high pressure metamorphic sample to be brought to the surface at sustained rates of up to 5mm per year. Analysis and radiometric dating of these high pressure and ultra high pressure metamorphic rocks can help reconstruct the tectonic evolution of the orogenic belt that formed them.

== Evidence ==
In the Himalaya, the Indian continental plate is crashing into the Eurasian continental plate with nearly north-south motion. Therefore, the compression of the rocks in the Himalaya is in the north-south direction. So, folding should occur trending east-west, as is observed. However, it has also been noted that folding occurs in the north-south direction. It was noted that these folds follow the traces of the major rivers, such as the Arun and the Indus. Originally these folds were explained by assuming that the rivers did not form these anticlines, instead the river's course was by coincidence on top of these geologic features, forming by differential erosion. The idea of isostatic rebound was suggested as the best fit mechanism for these north-south trending folds and is now widely accepted.

== Formation processes ==
formation of a river anticline

The formation of a river anticline by isostatic rebound is illustrated in the figure to the right in idealized steps. The principle of Isostasy says that if the lithosphere is free to move vertically, then it will float at an appropriate depth in the asthenosphere based on the thickness and density of the lithosphere. River anticlines form when huge amounts of material are removed by river erosion in an area with low crustal rigidity. The crust rebounds up specifically along the river, while the rest of the area remains relatively constant. This will bend the crust forming an anticline, which can take up to ten thousand years. As a river flows through the area, it erodes away large amounts of the overlying rock, which causes a decrease in the lithosphere's mass, leading to an isostatic response. With no overlying rock, the underlying material rebounds up, like removing a weight from a raft. As the river progresses the erosion continues and therefore the rebounding continues, which will form a low wide antiformal structure. For this rebound to occur the erosion from the river must exceed the average erosion rate for the area and exceed the uplift of the orogen. The average erosion rates for the Himalaya are about 1 mm per year, while the erosion rate for the Arun River of the eastern Himalaya is up to 8 mm per year, so it makes sense that we would see river anticlines along the Arun River.

== Tectonic aneurysms ==
A tectonic aneurysm is an isolated zone of extreme uplift and exhumation rates. This forms when uplift from local tectonics are combined with very weak crust and uplift from a river anticline. When a major river flows over an area of tectonic uplift, the erosion from the river will erode the uplifted material. This will cause extremely rapid exhumation along the major rivers, of up to 10 mm per year. Within the Himalaya there are two tectonic aneurysms, each on one of the two syntaxis of the orogenic belt: Nanga Parbat in the west and Namche Barwa in the east. These tectonic aneurysms form in similar ways to river anticlines, but with extreme erosion rates and very weak and ductile crust. The syntaxis mark the end of the Himalayan orogen on either side and define the location of two large rivers, the Indus and the Yarlung Tsangpo River. The syntaxis on either side of the Himalaya are dominated by a strike slip fault zone, instead of a compressional thrust faulting, as in the rest of the orogen. In the west the Indus River flows through the Nanga Parbat and in the east the Yarlung Tsangpo River flows through the Namche Barwa. The very high erosion rates of these two rivers is coupled with weak, hot, thin, dry, crust to form areas of extreme uplift and exhumation.

Figure 1: A diagram of a young tectonic aneurysm. Isothermal gradient anticline caused by channel incision creating a thinner crust than the surrounding. Strain is focused into weakness forcing warm material into the zone thereby lifting isotherms locally

Figure 2: An advanced tectonic aneurysm. Isothermal gradient becomes more advanced than in the young stage. Material flow causes surface uplift of young rock on the peripheral edges of the erosion area. The uplift brings weak warm rocks to the surface and creates high relief. This causes accelerated mass wasting and easier erosion thereby enforcing the positive feedback

Figure 3: This diagram contrasts the crustal strength of a landscape with significant localized erosion(Blue Dashed Line) when compared to an unmodified landscape (Green Dashed Line). The strength profile illustrated in the diagram is only in the brittle zone with an assumed constant increase with depth on the basis of increased pressure with increased overlying mass.

=== Deformation mechanism ===
Deformation caused by tectonic aneurysms are similar to aneurysms in blood vessels in which weakening of the confining force allows for localized growth or uplift. However, in the geological setting, deformation occurs over millions of years with significant sustained erosion power ranging from tens of hundreds of kiloWatts per meter. Incision or crustal thinning of an area on the surface relative to the background crust thickness causes two things to occur that allow for aneurysm formation. Firstly, due to the brittle nature of crustal rocks and their pressure dependent strength, the decrease in overlying material depresses the crustal strength when compared to surrounding areas. This occurs because the removal of crust decreases the overburden and thus the pressure which influences the strength. Secondly, the geothermal gradient increases vertically. Localized deep valleys create weakest areas that focus strain and thereby the movement of deep ductile material.

By weakening the crust in a localized area, a preferential region of strain can develop concentrating the flow of material. Ductile rocks deeper in the crust will be able to move towards the potential gradient, whereas brittle rocks near the surface will fracture when subject to increased strain. The transition between brittle deformation and ductile deformation is determined by the temperature which is generally controlled by depth as well as rheology. Weak hot minerals, below the ductile transition, with significant partial melt move into the area underlying the thinned crust as a result of the pressure gradient being decreased in the thin area. At a certain point, the pressure will decrease substantially moving from convergent basement rock into thinned crust. This causes rapid decompression at relatively stable and raised isotherms. Decompression melting occurs, which increases the proportion of partial melt within the material and causes rapid heat advection towards the surface. Continued convergent plate movement focuses the flow of material into the syntaxial areas with the localized weakness permitting upward escape as an accommodation mechanism. This process solves the fundamental problem of material being forced into a confined space by creating an outlet. The result of which creates a positive feedback with erosion focusing uplift which transports more weak rock vertically enhancing erosive capabilities. Areas of consistent elevation in river valleys and mountains with relief can be maintained by high exhumation rates of relatively young weak rocks. The ages of minerals in the area will be younger than the surrounding crust due to cooling occurring in an area with a steeper thermal gradient at shallower depths. Mature tectonic aneurysm systems, such as the Nanga Parbat, can have very high local reliefs of young rocks due to consistent erosion maintaining the elevation in the erosive area and vertical strain forcing material up along the proximal edges.

=== Locations ===
Tectonic aneurysms are found in areas with localized high relief of relatively young rocks when compared to their surroundings. Actively observed systems that have been studied the most are located in 2 main regions of the Himalaya, the Nanga Parbat–Haramosh Massif and Namche Barwa–Gyala Peri which occur on the Eastern and Western edges respectively. The Indus River is the mechanism responsible for crustal removal in the Nanga Parbat region, and the Tsangpo River is active in the Namche Barwa region.

Proposed tectonic aneurysms are located in the Saint Elias region of Alaska, the Kongur Shan and Muztagh Ata in China, and the Lepontine Dome in the Swiss Alps. These locations show incipient or similar, less significant characteristics to actively observed systems. Glacial mechanisms of erosion and transport are believed to be responsible in many alpine areas including the Saint Elias system.

==== Nanga Parbat-Haramosh Tectonic Aneurysm ====
The Nanga Parbat-Haramosh is the most studied region in the context of tectonic aneurysms. The region has extreme relief over very short distances with the Indus River valley approximately 7 kilometers lower in elevation than the peak of the mountain. Within the study area, Biotite cooling ages (280 °C ± 40 °C) are consistently less than 10 million years old indicating rapid exhumation rates in the area. Studies of composition and structure of the rocks in the area suggest exhumation of depths below 20 kilometers. Exhumation rates from the massif and the valley are significantly higher than background rates. Calculations of peak exhumation rates range from 5 to 12 mm per year depending on the location. The mountain top has a lower rate than the bottom of the valley yet both are significantly higher when compared to background rates outside of the syntax. Exposed granulite within the central aneurysm area represents low-pressure melting and advection as material moved into areas with decreasing pressure. Up to 20 kilometers of domal unroofing over a very short period of time has been inferred based on the sample ages ranging from 1 to 3 million years.

==== Namche Barwa-Gyala Peri ====
The Namche Barwa-Gayla Peri tectonic aneurysm is located on the Eastern side of the Himalaya with the active Tsangpo River flowing down the valley between the mountains. Many researchers conclude the tectonic aneurysm model is the best explanation of the observed structures and tectonic arrangement of the region. The argon-argon biotite ages and zircon fission track ages of rocks from the area are 10 million years old or less, which is young compared to the surrounding rocks. Similar high reliefs seen in the Nanga Parbat are also evident with the Namche Barwa region, with approximately 4 kilometers of vertical elevation change over a short horizontal distance. High and low-grade metamorphic rocks are found in the region with evidence to suggest a variation of metamorphic activity between regions from the strain center and the edges. The exhumation occurs in a circular area with young, high-grade decompression melts focused in the center. Around the outside of the focus rubidium to strontium ratios suggest melting with fluid present. The presence of fluid within melt has been modeled to occur as a result of immense precipitation allowing water to penetrate into shallow crustal rocks over long periods of time. Ages and barometric regimes of the rocks were used to calculate the volume of overburden removed, which was used to determine 3 millimeters of annual incision over the last 10 million years.

==== Saint Elias ====
The proposed four million years old tectonic aneurysm system in the Saint Elias Mountains in Alaska was formed by glacial erosion on the mountains developed by underthrusting of the Yakutat microplate beneath the North American margin. The aneurysm occurs in the Northern plate corner in which transitions from dextral strike-slip motion to thrust sense motion thereby focusing strain. The interpreted relationship between erosion mountain development has more variations between researchers than Himalayan systems due to the age of the system and constraints regarding field work due to glacier cover. In the St. Elias range collision and underthrusting caused surface uplift forming mountains. The elevation increase climate regime allowed glacier development resulting in extreme glacial erosion potential. Since its inception, glacial erosion transported sediments West into the Pacific Ocean and onto the continental margin. After which, approximately two million years ago, the formation of a décollement caused the locus of strain to propagate south. The shift in strain focus resulted in mountain development farther South which disrupted the climatic system thereby decreasing precipitation in Northern regions of the Saint Elias Mountains. The erosion and exhumation are now concentrated on the southern portion of the mountain range which produces young cooling ages associated with the current tectonic aneurysm center.

Young detrital zircon fission track dating (240 °C ± 40 °C) and apatite fission track and uranium -thorium/ helium (110 °C ± 10 °C) cooling ages of sediments in glacial catchment areas support the theory of erosive influence on the St. Elias tectonic system. Rates of exhumation were inferred by calculating the difference between detrital zircon and apatite ages in sediments. The smaller the difference between zircon and apatite ages represents a faster movement of material through the isotherms and faster cooling. In the northern corner of contact between the plates, the zircon and apatite ages do not differ significantly, thereby providing evidence of rapid exhumation. The proximity to the depositional environment along the coastal margin and within fjords preserves a record of sedimentation rate which is used to interpret exhumation rates of 0.3 mm year originally and approximately 1.3 mm/year for the last million years. The sediment age and thickness are used to track the movement of the focus of erosion from the north to the south.

The presence of a definitive tectonic aneurysm system in the region is widely disputed with many researchers concluding insufficient focused exhumation is occurring to support the hypothesis. Significant glacial cover limits the number of field samples and geological observations that can be made directly on the surface thereby adding uncertainty to interpretations. Alternative theories argue tectonic transpressional control of exhumation with little erosive influence on the overall system. Younger ages are explained by focused strain areas resulting from faulting.

=== Field work in proposed regions ===
By comparing the depth in Earth at which particular minerals crystallize and the elevation at which they were sampled, the age of minerals can be used to determine the rate which the strain zone moved material vertically. Various dating methods on specific fluid inclusions and minerals were used in order to provide chronological data of the exhumation rate of rocks in the area. The age dates were used to reconstruct the history of exhumation and thermal regimes by comparing them to pressure and temperature crystallization boundaries of the minerals. Uranium-thorium and uranium-helium cooling ages of samples of apatite indicate the timing of 70 °C cooling. Higher closure temperatures were dated using argon–argon dating methods for biotite samples (300 °C) and zircon fission track dating (230 °C - 250 °C) methods. By analyzing the ages of minerals with various closure temperatures, researchers can infer the speed at which they moved through the isotherms. When the difference between the age of a mineral that cooled at a high temperature and one that cooled at a low temperature are relatively similar, then exhumation is inferred to be rapid. The geothermobarometry is obtained using garnet-biotite plagioclase in order to constrain higher pressure metamorphic regimes. Shallower exhumation rates (low-temperature cooling ages) alone can not realistically be used to describe tectonic aneurysms as deep isothermal gradient changes may not significantly affect shallower depths. Furthermore, shallow low-temperature cooling can be more largely related to erosion dominated exposure rather than tectonic driven uplift. Sample ages from minerals with higher cooling temperatures signify exhumation of deeper material which is the modeled function of a tectonic aneurysm.

Seismic velocity profiles are often used over large study areas in order to identify possible isothermal irregularities. Low-velocity data is indicative of hotter rocks with a higher degree of the partial melt which slows P-waves when compared to the surroundings. Magnetotelluric sampling is done to test the resistivity of the rocks which is used to infer the amount of fluid in the rocks.
