= Lessivage =

Lessivage, or argilluviation, refers to the movement of fine clay minerals from the upper part of a soil to the lower part of a soil, via the downward movement of water through the soil matrix. Lessivage is the primary mechanism in the formation of the diagnostic, clay-enriched argic, or Bt horizon (Canadian System of Soil Classification) of Luvisolic soils.

== Mechanisms ==
Lessivage occurs when water that infiltrates the soil picks up negatively charged clay particles, creating a colloid suspension, and carries them downward until changes in the soil physical or chemical environment cause the clay to settle out by flocculation. Clay particles settle out of the water if the water remains stagnant for a long period of time, or the clay interacts with positively charged ions deeper in the soil. These interactions create larger molecules that settle out more quickly than clay alone. As the clay and clay complexes accumulate lower in the soil, soil pore-sizes become finer at the zone of accumulation, referred to as the illuvial horizon, further promoting the deposition of clay.

== Occurrence ==
Lessivage is most common in medium-textured soils within regions that have moderate to high precipitation. It is often associated with deciduous and mixed forested environments where organic acids enhance clay dispersion in the upper soil horizons. It occurs mostly in loams due to their sufficient level of clay and medium-texture which allows them to hold water but still drain well. In contrast, very sandy soils drain rapidly and lack sufficient clay, while clay-rich soils drain very slowly, if at all, reducing the depth that the clay migrates.

Lessivage is widespread in regions such as central and eastern Canada, parts of Europe, and temperate zones of Asia.

== Implications and management ==
The deposition of negatively charged clay particles in the lower soil enhances a soil's fertility by increasing its ability to retain positively charged plant nutrients, referred to as the cation exchange capacity (CEC).

Lessivage doesn't normally impede soil function, however depending on the depth and amount of clay in the illuvial horizon, soils influenced by lessivage may be more susceptible to compaction from foot, animal or machine traffic. Overly compacted soils can experience ponding at the surface and may severely limit plant root growth. Land management practices that avoid compaction and improve drainage such as limiting traffic (especially while the soil is wet), tillage by subsoiling and the installation of drain-tile may be needed if the clay-enriched lower horizon becomes too compacted.

== See also ==
- Leaching (agriculture)
- Leaching (pedology)
- Canadian system of soil classification
