= The Devil's Nest =

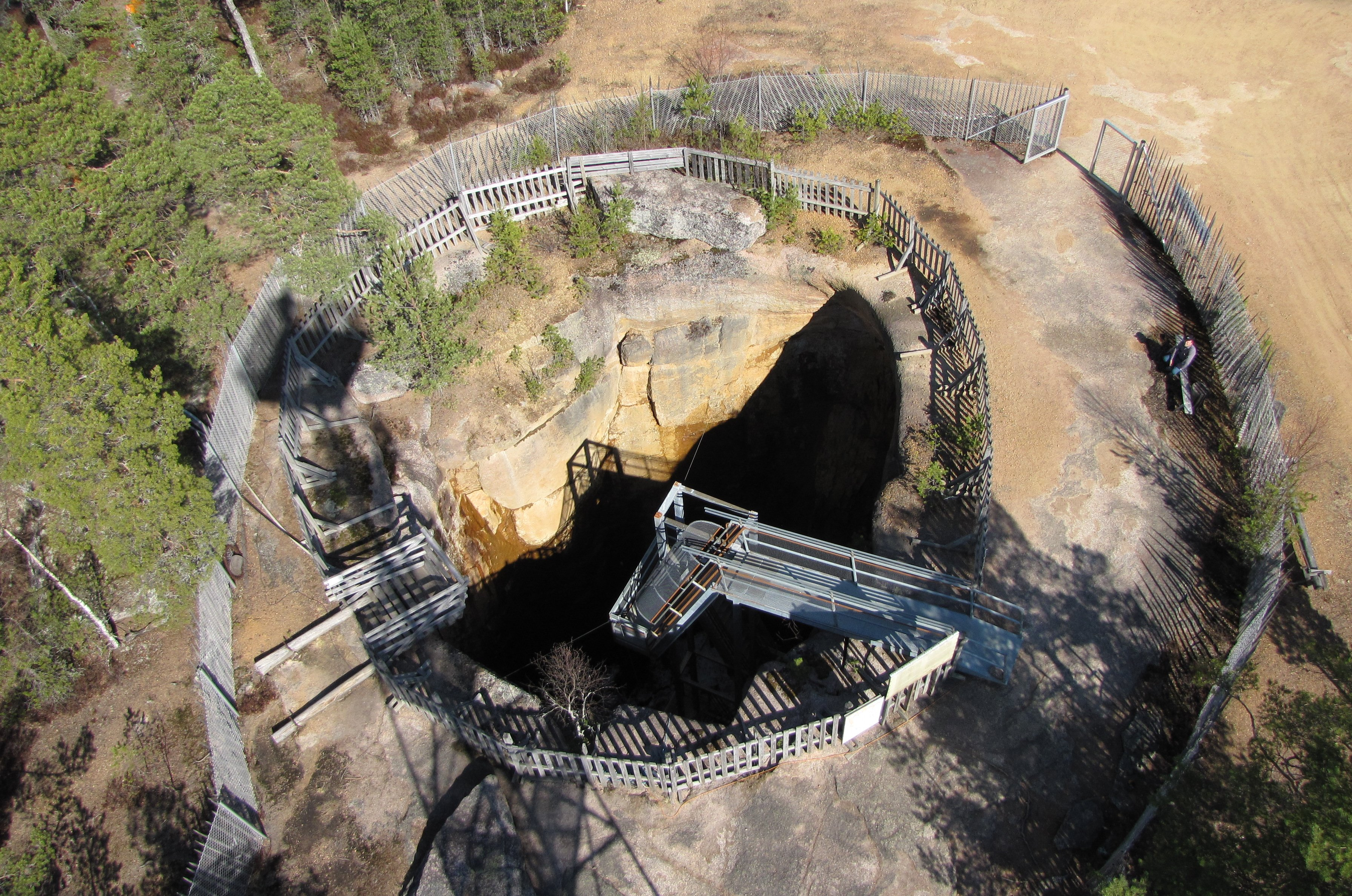
The truly surrounded Pirunpesä seen from the 21-meter observation tower.

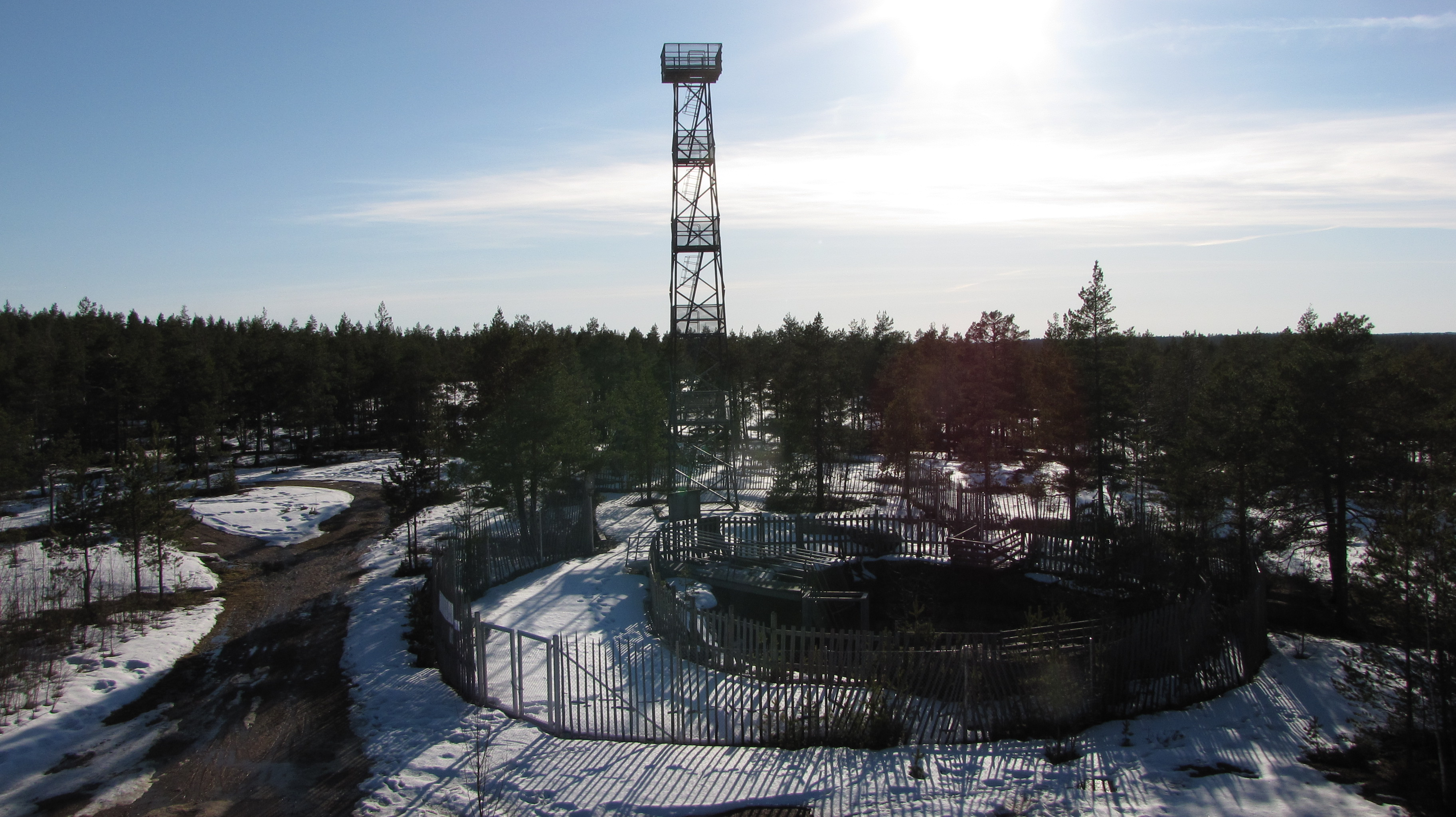
Pirunpesä mouth, lookout tower and Isovuori lake.

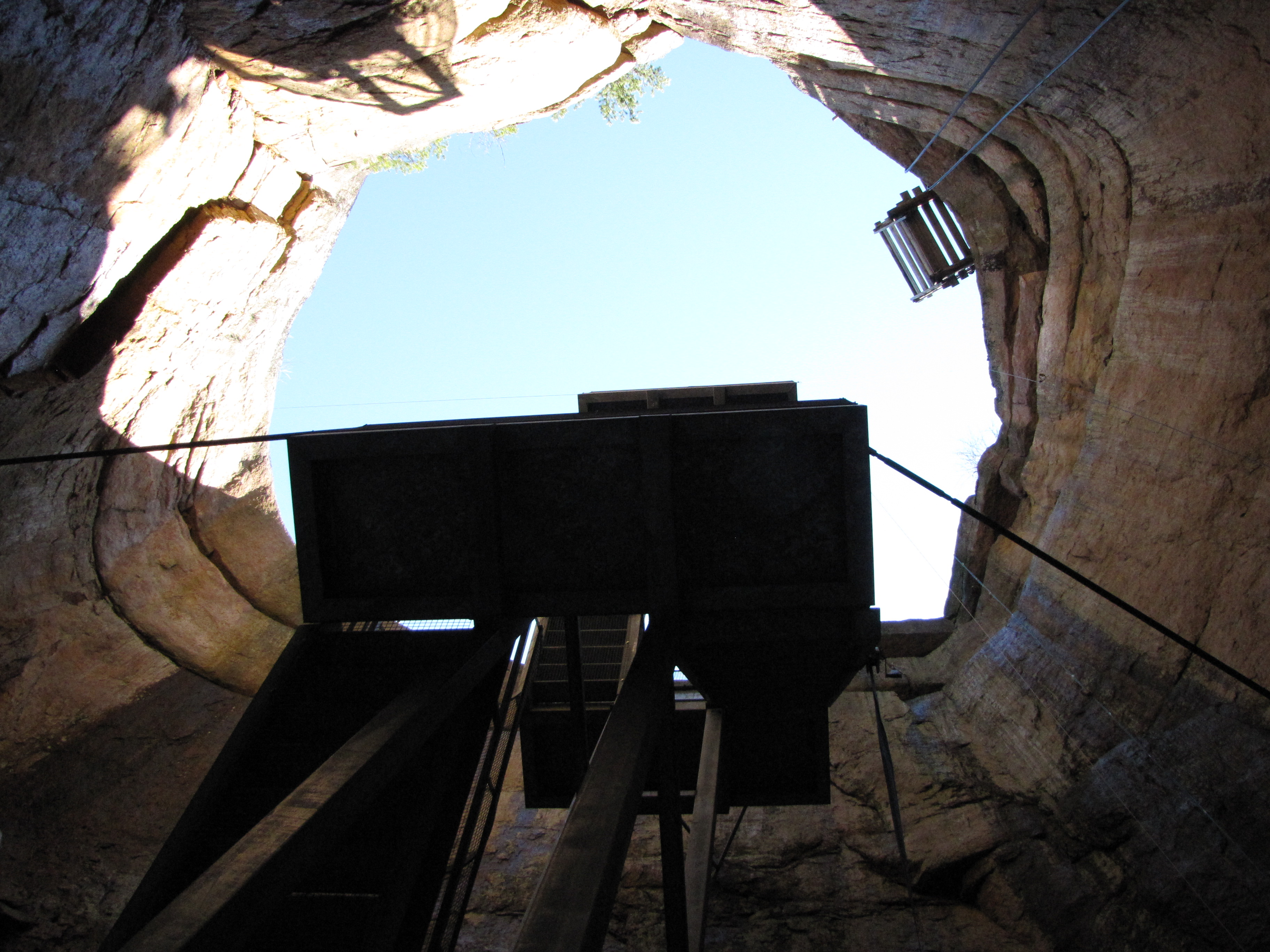
View from the bottom of Pirunpesä upwards.

The Devil's Nest or Pirunpesä in Finnish, is an erosional cavity in Kurikka, which currently has a diameter of 14 meters and a depth of 23 meters. A staircase has been built at the bottom of the cavity and it is fenced; a small entrance fee is charged for visiting inside the fence. Access to the rest of the area is free. There is also a cafe on site.

== Etymology ==
Pirunpesä got its name from the local population, because in the past Pirunpesä was full of large stone boulders, and in the cavities between the boulders it was thought that the devil lived. Children have been warned that the devil might come and take them away if they got close to this gap.

Some stories tell that the opening was so deep that if you dropped a small stone between the boulders, it fell from stone to stone for many minutes.

== Geology ==
The area's bedrock consists of coarse-grained reddish granite containing feldspar crystals with a diameter of 2–4 centimeters. The groundmass consists of hornblende, biotite, quartz and albite with plagioclase. To the west, northwest and north of Pirunpesä is a large deep rock area consisting mostly of granodiorite and quartz. In addition, there are diorite–gabbro lenses in places.

== Emptying the Devil's Nest ==
In the summer of 1980, business representative Pekka Kunnas and Jalasjärvi municipality's director of schools Kustaa Ala-Hautala were told about a special, rather round rock depression located on Ylivalli's Isovuori, which was filled with large boulders. In addition, the edges of the recess were partially rounded. It was thought that the depression might be a large-sized pothole from the time before the last glaciation. The municipality of Jalasjärvi decided to empty the depression, as Pirunpesä was a touristic and geologically interesting destination.

At the beginning of 1997, the Yylivalli village committee started deepening Pirunpesä again, on the initiative of amateur scientist, writer and pseudoscientist from Turku, Keijo Parkkusen, thus reaching its current depth. The financiers of the project were the municipalit of Jalasjärvi and Spede Pasanen. The management consultant Mauno Välimäki from Yylivalli was responsible for organizing the emptying project.
