= Asociación de Antropólogos Iberoamericanos en Red =

Organization of anthropologists

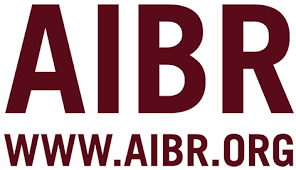
- AIBR association logo
- Formation: 1996
- Headquarters: Madrid
- Location: Madrid
- Fields: Anthropology
- Website: www.AIBR.org

The AIBR (Network of Iberoamerican Anthropologists, from the Spanish Antropólogos Iberoamericanos en Red) is an association for anthropologists started in 1996 with the creation of the portal El Rincón del Antropólogo (The Anthropologist's Corner), which was one of the first portals related to anthropology in the Spanish-speaking world. The association has grown into a network that connects more than 7,000 anthropologists from Spain, Portugal, and the Latin-American countries.

== Creation of AIBR and AIBR. Revista de Antropología Iberoamericana ==
In November 2002, the association was legally constituted and recognized by the Minister of the Interior of Spain. Since 2001, AIBR has published the scientific journal AIBR. Revista de Antropología Iberoamericana ('Journal of Iberoamerican Anthropology') every four months, both electronically and on paper.

== AIBR Annual International Conference of Anthropology ==
In July 2015, the association held its first international conference under the global theme "The human being: cultures, origins, and destiny", with over 800 delegates gathering in Madrid, Spain. The meeting was presented by anthropologist Didier Fassin of the Institute for Advanced Study in Princeton, and closed with a lecture by Aurora González Echevarria of the Autonomous University of Barcelona.

The Second AIBR International Conference took place in Barcelona in September 2016, under the global theme "Identity: Bridges, Thresholds, and Barriers". This edition opened with a plenary address by Arturo Escobar (University of North Carolina at Chapel Hill), and continued with lectures by Tim Ingold (University of Aberdeen), Verena Stolcke (Autonomous University of Barcelona), and Manuel Delgado (University of Barcelona).

The Third AIBR International Conference took place in Puerto Vallarta, Mexico, in November 2017 and was the first edition of the AIBR Conference to take place in the Americas. The theme was "Travels, crossings, displacements", and the conference began with an inaugural lecture by Marc Augé of the École des Hautes Études en Sciences Sociales (EHESS).

The Fourth AIBR International Conference of Anthropology took place in Granada, Spain, under the general theme "Dialogues, Encounters, and Stories from the Souths". This edition began with a plenary session by Nigel Barley and closed with a plenary session by Paul Stoller (West Chester University, Pennsylvania). Additionally, a new form of meeting was introduced, with the first "Diálogo a Dos" between María Teresa del Valle (University of Basque Country) and Mónica Tarducci (University of Buenos Aires) on the connections between anthropology and feminism.

Year	City	Theme	Website
2015	Madrid, Spain	The Human Being: Cultures, Origins, and Destiny	http://2015.aibr.org
2016	Barcelona, Spain	Identity: Bridges, Thresholds, and Barriers	http://2016.aibr.org
2017	Puerto Vallarta, Mexico	Travels, crossings, displacements	http://2017.aibr.org
2018	Granada, Spain	Encounters, dialogues and stories from the Souths	http://2018.aibr.org
2019	Madrid, Spain	Thinking cultures, changing worlds	http://2019.aibr.org
2020	Virtual	Humanities in emergency, health and social reconstruction	http://2020.aibr.org
2021	Vila Real, Portugal	Humanity: unity and diversity	http://2021.aibr.org
2022	Salamanca, Spain	Legacies	http://2022.aibr.org
2023	Mexico City, Mexico	The Intercultural Challenge	http://2023.aibr.org
2024	Madrid, Spain	Anthropological Intelligence	http://2024.aibr.org
2025	Santander, Spain	Expectations and Uncertainties	http://2025.aibr.org

List of plenary speakers who have participated in both the opening and closing sessions and who have been recognized for contributions to the discipline in the international arena.

List of notable speakers
Speaker	Center	Year	Congress	Title
Didier Fassin	Institute for Advanced Study, Princeton	2015	Madrid, Spain	Noticias del terreno. Una defensa e ilustración de la etnografía.
Aurora González Echevarría	Autonomous University of Barcelona	2015	Madrid, Spain	El alcance de las teorías sobre la parentalidad. La comparación transcultural como extensión de modelos etnográficos.
Arturo Escobar	University of North Carolina at Chapel Hill	2016	Barcelona, Spain	Entramados, puentes, y muros epistémicos: Tejiendo el pluriverso.
Tim Ingold	University of Aberdeen	2016	Barcelona, Spain	One World Anthropology.
Verena Stolcke	Autonomous University of Barcelona	2016	Barcelona, Spain	A propósito de naciones, nacionalidades y fronteras. No es racismo, estúpido.
Manuel Delgado Ruiz	University of Barcelona	2016	Barcelona, Spain	La Antropología en los tiempos del cólera. Una reflexión y un balance.
Marc Augé	École des Hautes Études en Sciences Sociales	2017	Puerto Vallarta, Mexico	El viaje como ilusión y como promesa.
Nigel Barley	British Museum	2018	Granada, Spain	Making exhibitions of Ourselves.
Paul Stoller	West Chester University	2018	Granada, Spain	Slow anthropology in a Fast World.
Rosana Guber	University of Buenos Aires	2019	Madrid, Spain	Pensar la etnografía en Iberoamérica: 4 líneas y 4 paradojas desde el trabajo de campo.
Francisco J. Ferrándiz	CSIC	2019	Madrid, Spain	¿Exhumar a Francisco Franco? Etnografía de un descenso a las profundidades del Valle.
Paul Stoller	West Chester University	2020	Virtual edition	The art of ethnography in troubled times.
Miguel Vale de Almeida	ISCTE – University Institute of Lisbon	2020	Virtual edition	What to do? Anthropology in front of the contemporary reaction.
Kath Weston	University of Virginia, University of Edinburgh	2021	Vila Real, Portugal	Counterfactual Ethnography:Imagining What It Takes to Live Differently.
Gustavo Lins Ribeiro	Universidad Autónoma Metropolitana, Unidad Lerma	2021	Vila Real, Portugal	Diversidad de flujos internacionales antropológicos. La influencia de una antropología latinoamericana.
Joanne Rappaport	Georgetown University	2022	Salamanca, Spain	Reflexiones sobre la traducción de la etnografía al cómic.
Ruth Behar	University of Michigan	2022	Salamanca, Spain	¿Qué quedará...? Algunas respuestas desde la autoetnografía y la ficción para jóvenes.
Eduardo Restrepo	Universidad Católica de Temuco	2023	Ciudad de México	Interculturalidad en la lucha contra el racismo en Colombia: alcances y limitaciones.
Eve Danziger	University of Virginia	2023	Ciudad de México	Hablando de otros: el cristianismo como distinción social en la América Latina indígena.
Linda Manzanilla	Universidad Nacional Autónoma de México	2023	Ciudad de México	La diversidad cultural en el pasado prehispánico.El reto de vivir en la primera urbe multiétnica del centro de México: Teotihuacan.
Anastasia V. Sergeeva	Vrije Universiteit	2024	Madrid	Robots in our midst: an ethnographer in the new world of work.
Marcio Goldman	Universidade Federal do Rio de Janeiro	2024	Madrid	Antropología y Saberes Orgánicos: Los Posibles de un Encuentro Cosmopolítico.
Pedro Pitarch	Universidad Complutense de Madrid	2024	Madrid	El trickster de la Antropología.
Susan Paulson	University of Florida	2025	Santander, Spain	What do gender and kinship have to do with climate change?
Wolfgang Gabbert	Leibniz University Hannover	2025	Santander, Spain	Sustainable development, Western concepts and indigenous ontologies.

== AIBR Best Article Award in Iberoamerican Anthropology ==
Since 2013, the AIBR Best Article Award in Iberoamerican Anthropology has been awarded annually to the best article from the previous calendar year. This award is sponsored by the AIBR journal and comes with a prize of EUR 450. The winning article and articles shortlisted for the Award are published in the scientific journal AIBR.

Year	Author	Title	Title Spanish
2013	Olatz González-Abrisketa	Displaced bodies: gender, sport, and cultural domination in the Basque court	Cuerpos desplazados. Género, deporte, y protagonismo cultural en la plaza vasca.
2014	Juan Antonio Flores Martos	Emerging iconographies and patrimonized deaths in Latin America: Holly dead, miraculous dead and adopted dead	Iconografías emergentes y muertes patrimonializadas en América Latina: Santa Muerte, muertos milagrosos y muertos adoptados
2015	Marco Tobón	Dreams as ethnographic tools	Los sueños como instrumentos etnográficos
2016	Felipe Cárdenas Tamara	The sign Cultural Landscape from the horizons of Semiotic Anthropology	El signo paisaje cultural desde los horizontes de la antropología semiótica
2017	Gabriel Ruiz Romero	Three times at the square: Staging of a ceremony of statal public forgiveness due to the acts of paramilitary violence in Colombia	Tres veces en la plaza: Escenificación de una ceremonia estatal de perdón público por actos de violencia paramilitar en Colombia
2018	Gerardo Fernández Juárez	A Kallawaya master in Madrid's Gran Vía	Un kallawaya en la «Gran Vía». Notas de campo en Madrid
2019	Peter C. Little	Bodies, Toxins, and E-Waste Labour Interventions in Ghana: Toward a Toxic Postcolonial Corporality?	Cuerpos, toxinas e intervenciones laborales con residuos electrónicos en Ghana: ¿Hacia una corporalidad poscolonial tóxica?
2020	Paula Escribano, Agata Hummel, José Luis Molina	He is an Entrepreneur, but I am not; I am a Self-Employed Worker: Self-Representation and Subsistence of Neo-Peasants in Catalonia	Él es emprendedor pero yo no. Yo soy autónomo. Autorrepresentación y subsistencia de los campesinos en Cataluña
2021	Lydia Rodríguez Cuevas	The Languages of the Mind	Los lenguajes del pensamiento
2022	Laura Marina Panizo	The Agency of Death: Experiences with Ghosts in Colina, Santiago de Chile	Los fantasmas de Chicureo: Convivir con muertos en el Barrio de Colina, Santiago de Chile
2023	Rosario Carmona Yost	Indigenous peoples' participation in climate policy. An ethnographic review of the Chilean experience	Participación de los pueblos indígenas en la política climática. Una revisión etnográfica de la experiencia chilena
2024	Malely Linares Sánchez, Inmaculada Postigo Gómez	P'urhépecha women facing male violence: Embodying memory and defending the territory	Mujeres p´urhépecha frente a las violencias machistas: Acuerpar la memoria y defender el territorio

== More information ==
AIBR is not affiliated with any university or academic institution, nor does it follow any political or religious faith. It is a private, independent initiative that anyone may join. It is funded by projects and activities, and the annual subscription fees provided by its members. AIBR has belonged to the International Union of Anthropological and Ethnological Sciences (IUAES) since July 2005.
