= Åke Sundborg =

Swedish geographer (1921–2007)

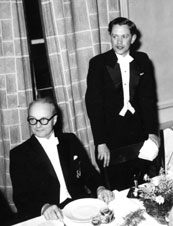
- Åke Sundborg to the right of Filip Hjulström, 1957.
- Born: 15 October 1921; Segmon, Värmland, Sweden
- Died: 23 May 2007 (aged 85)
- Education: Uppsala University
- Known for: Process geomorphology
- Awards: Vega Medal (1987)
- Scientific career
- Fields: Fluvial geomorphology
- Workplaces: Uppsala University
- Doctoral advisor: Filip Hjulström

Åke Sundborg (15 October 1921 – 23 May 2007) was a Swedish geographer and geomorphologist known for his contributions to the hydrology and geomorphological dynamics of rivers. He was active at Uppsala University where he studied under the supervision of Filip Hjulström eventually succeeding him on the chair of physical geography. Besides his studies of rivers Sundborg made contributions on the climate of cities, the distribution of loess and the sedimentation of reservoirs and lakes. He studied rivers in Sweden as well as various large rivers in Africa and Asia.

== Academic career ==
Sundborg's filosofie licentiat thesis had as subject the city climate of Uppsala. The thesis came to be internationally recognized with climatologist Helmut Landsberg praising it for containing one of the first theories on the climate of cities.

Åke Sundborg was drawn to the charismatic Filip Hjulström who influenced him to shift his field of study and pursue Ph.D. studies on fluvial geomorphology under his tutelage. Sundborg's 1956 Ph.D. thesis explored the link between geomorphology and hydrology in the meanders of the lower course of Klarälven in his native Värmland. The thesis came to be considered a reference work for similar studies. By 1956 Åke Sundborg had greatly improved the Hjulström curve diagram adding lines and a higher level of detail. Subsequently, he was employed by the Uppsala University where he directed the construction of the geomorphological laboratory. Over time this laboratory attracted numerous visiting scholars and Ph.D. students. Together with the other Ph.D. students of Hjulström, Anders Rapp, Valter Axelsson and John O. Norrman, Sundborg was part of what came to be known as the Uppsala School of Physical Geography. Beginning in the 1960s Sundborg begun a series of river studies outside Sweden, both as researcher and as foreign advisor. As such he studied the Mississippi, Rufiji, the Nile, Ganges, Brahmaputra, the Red River and the Yellow River. In the 1960s Sundborg studied the consequences of the damming of the Euphrates prior to the building of the Tabqa Dam in Syria. Sundborg estimated the amounts of sediments that would enter the new lake (that in the 1970s originated Lake Assad) and made a mathematical modell on how a new river delta would develop in it. Later upstream dam-building in Turkey however diminished greatly the sediments carried into Lake Assad.

Sundborg succeeded Hjulström as professor of physical geography at Uppsala University in 1969 and held that position until 1986. He was elected member of the Royal Swedish Academy of Sciences in 1973.
