= John O. Norrman =

Swedish geographer and geomorphologist

- Born: 29 July 1929; Stockholm
- Died: 14 December 2013 (aged 92)
- Citizenship: Sweden
- Education: Uppsala University
- Known for: Process geomorphology
- Scientific career
- Fields: Coastal geomorphology
- Workplaces: Uppsala University
- Doctoral advisor: Filip Hjulström

John Olof Norrman (29 July 1929 – 14 December 2013) was a Swedish geographer and geomorphologist known for his contributions to the coastal dynamics. Together with the other Ph.D. students of Filip Hjulström; Anders Rapp, Valter Axelsson and Åke Sundborg, Norrman was part of what came to be known as the Uppsala School of Physical Geography. Norrman became in 1971 professor of physical geography at Uppsala and in 1987 he was elected member of the Royal Swedish Academy of Sciences.
