= ADETTI =

Non-profit research institution in Portugal

Associação para o Desenvolvimento das Telecomunicações e Técnicas de Informática
- Established: 1989
- Location: Portugal

ADETTI (Associação para o Desenvolvimento das Telecomunicações e Técnicas de Informática) is a non-profit research institution in Portugal.

It was created in 1989, aiming at the development of Information and Communication Technologies, contributing to the advance of knowledge and science and the enhancement of quality in management, marketing and in Business Competitiveness.

ADETTI is structured by organizational units called Research Lines, which have well defined research and development objectives.

In ADETTI, several lecturers and professors of the Information Sciences and Technologies Department, of the Department of Marketing and of the Department of Management Sciences of ISCTE - Instituto Superior das Ciências do Trabalho e da Empresa a public Business, Social and Technological Sciences University Institute in Lisbon, develop their Research activities.

13 PhD, 11 MSc and 6 MBA are presently involved in research and development tasks at ADETTI, as well as growing number of research staff, Post-doc, PhD and MSc students, totalling more than eighty persons. A large number of undergraduate students of Computing and Engineering, are also participating in ADETTI projects in the scope of their final work for graduation.

The activities of ADETTI span the range of research and development in the framework of national and European-funded R&D programmes, with an active role in the transfer of research results into the Portuguese and European Markets and in the support to the creation of "start-ups" of technological foundation.

In the national context, ADETTI is a research unit of the national programme of R&D funding, under the umbrella of the Science and Technology Foundation (FCT) and, in the European arena, ADETTI has been participating in the various Framework Programmes that have been supporting the European Research space, since 1990, namely, RACE II, ESPRIT IV, ACTS, TEN-IBC, TELEMATICS, FP5 IST, FP5 Growth, FP6 IST as well as the INTERREG Regional framework programme.

As a landmark for the active role of ADETTI's participation in the European R&D Research support programmes, during the FP5 programme (1998–2002), the European ADETTI funding effort reached 3 million Euro and was ranked the second Portuguese Academic R&D institution in the FP5 IST programme (after INESC Porto) and the third in the ranking of all the Portuguese institutions participating in that programme (after Portugal Telecom Inovação and INESC Porto).

== CGM Lab ==
This research line focuses in the scientific developments in the domains of 3D computer graphics, virtual and augmented reality, imaging and computer supported cooperative work, with especial emphasis in industrial applications in areas, such as Textile, Fashion and Apparel, Architecture, Plastic Moulds, Entertainment and Spatial Industries.

== 2004-2007 Interrig III B « Atlantic Area », PIMHAI ==
"Multispextral and hyperspectral imagery analysis from acquisition to decision, making and expertise in environment management" (2004–2007) Coordenador por parte da ADETTI e líder de pacote de trabalho na área de DRM."The objective of this project is to provide the industrial sector and the political/institutional decision-makers of the Atlantic with an operational system including the acquisition and the analysis of aerial EO remote sensing images. This system will be devoted to the internmental problems in their region. This system will be open and will integrate the recent and future developments of research inmultisource/multicomponent imagery". No PIMHAI, an ADETTI vai desenvolver e integrar tecnologias de codificação JPEG2000, DRM e Sistemas de Informação Geográfica em Plataformas móveis.

== 2004–2006: FP6 IST IP MediaNet ==
Multimedia networking Coordenador por parte da ADETTI e líder de pacote de trahalho na área de DRM. "The objective of this projects is to provide the industrial sector and the political/institutional decision-makers of the Atlantic area with an operational system including the acquisition and the analysis of aerial EO remote sensing images. This system will be open and will integrate the recent and future developments of research in multisourde/multicompment imagery". No PIMHAI, an ADETTI vai desenvolver e integrar tecnologias de codificação JPEG200, DRM e Sistemas de Informação Geográfica em Plataformas móviles.

== 2004–2006 FP6 IST STREP WCAM ==
Wireless Cameras and Audio-visual Seamless Networking” (2004-2006) Coordenador por parte da ADETTI e líder de pacote de trabalho na área de DRM. “The WCAM project will develop and validate a seamless networked audio-visual system aiming at convergence between video surveillance and multimedia distribution (broadcast, mobile and Internet), taking into account real time aspects as well as adaptive quality of service and security. The project will use and improve state of the art technologies in each of the involved systems, combining, adapting and/or enhancing them when necessary. The following elements will be used in the WCAM system: Adaptive encoding techniques allowing the inclusion of scene analysis in the optimisation of the video encoding as well as generating rich information. State of the art visual encoding schemes, H.264 and MotionJPEG 2000 Internetworking and adaptive Quality of service features Security, both on the network and the content level Multimedia storage and distribution”
