= Urbanization and Global Environmental Change Project =

Research project

Urbanization and Global Environmental Change
- Research type: Applied
- Field of research: Urbanization, Earth system science
- Executive Officer: Michail Fragkias
- Location: Tempe, Arizona, Arizona, United States
- Parent Institute: International Human Dimensions Programme
- Affiliations: Arizona State University
- Website: ugec.org

The Urbanization and Global Environmental Change Project (UGEC) is one of the core research projects of the International Human Dimensions Programme on Global Environmental Change (IHDP). UGEC aims to understand the bi-directional interactions between urbanization and global environmental change. The UGEC International Project Office is located at Arizona State University.

According to its Science Plan, UGEC aims to provide a better understanding of the interactions and feedbacks between global environmental change and urbanization at the local, regional, and global scales. UGEC pursues four areas of research:

1. Processes within urban systems that contribute to global environmental change (e.g., the impact of urbanization on carbon emissions; the effects of urban land cover change on biodiversity and habitat).
2. Pathways through which specific global environmental changes affect urban systems (e.g., climate change impacts on urban areas; decline in ecosystem services on urban climate regulation).
3. Urban responses to global environmental change (e.g., urban strategies for climate change mitigation and adaptation).
4. Consequences of urban responses to global environmental change.

Additionally, the goals of UGEC include:

- creating multidimensional integrative perspectives;
- promoting parallel and comparative analysis across regions and themes;
- utilizing cross-temporal and cross-spatial scale approaches; and
- outreaching and communicating UGEC-related scientific information to policy makers and the public.

== Funding ==
UGEC's financial sponsors include IHDP, Arizona State University, and the National Science Foundation.
