= Susana de Noronha =

Portuguese anthropologist

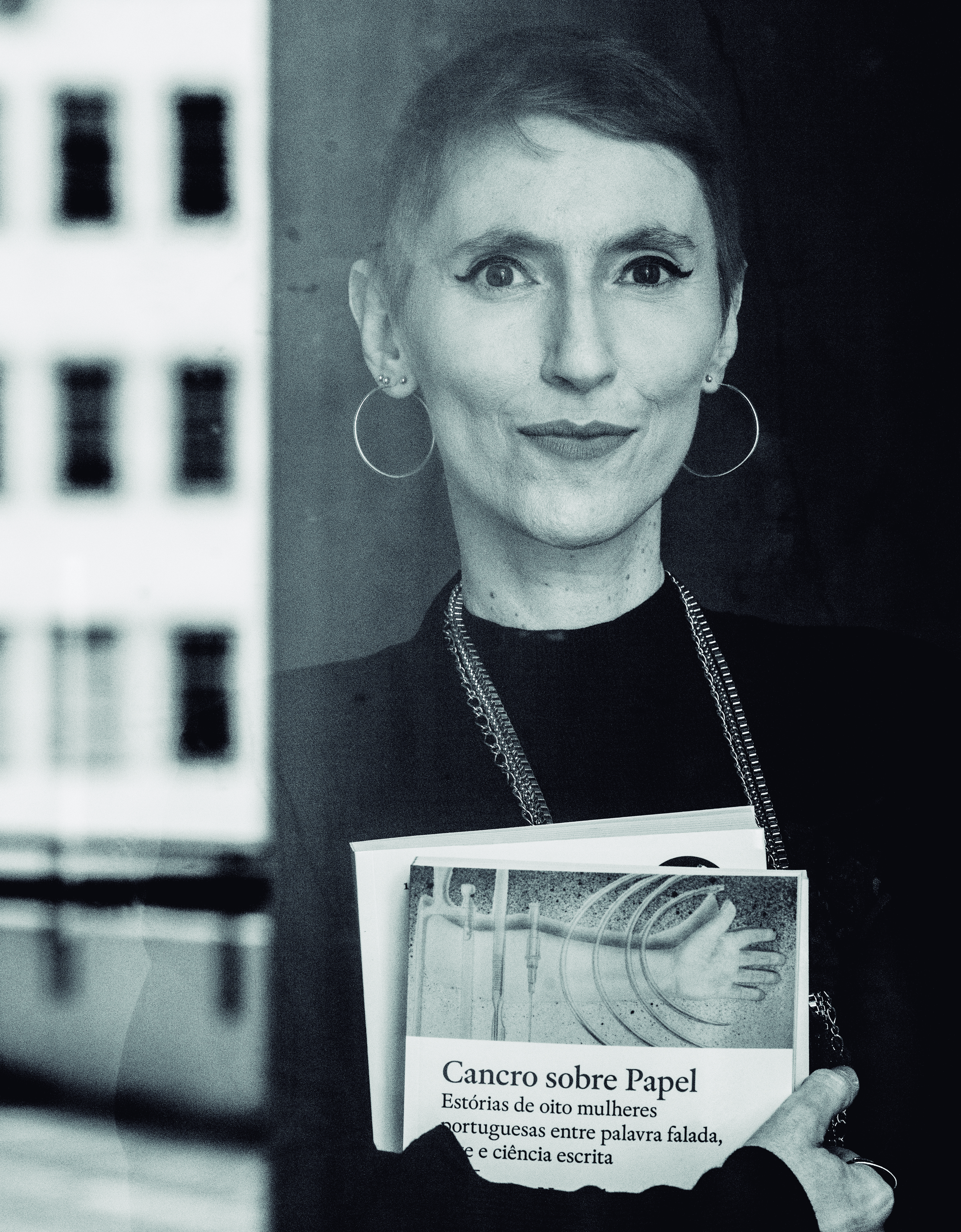
- Born: Maria Susana Pinto Figueiredo de Noronha
- Awards: Mulheres na Ciência (2023); 30 Anos, 30 Antropólogos (2023); Prémio CES para Jovens Cientistas Sociais de Língua Portuguesa (2007); Prémio Bernardino Machado (2003)
- Website: sites.google.com/view/susana-de-noronha/
- Academic career

Susana de Noronha is a Portuguese anthropologist, PhD in sociology, and researcher Centre for Research and Studies in Sociology (CIES), Iscte - University Institute of Lisbon (IUL). Previously, she served as an Invited Assistant Professor in the Department of Sociology at the Institute of Social Sciences (ICS) of the University of Minho (from 2022 to 2025) and as a Researcher at the Centre for Social Studies (CES) of the University of Coimbra (from 2018 to 2024).

She is a founding member of AIDA - Social Sciences Research Network on Artificial Intelligence, Data, and Algorithms. Previously, she held the position of coordinator of the Center for Studies on Science, Economy, and Society (NECES-CES) and was a member of the Permanent Committee of the Scientific Council of CES (from 2020 to January 2022).

Concentrating at the crossroads of art, science, and technology studies, she has been exploring medical anthropology and anthropology of art and material culture. Her work, which is qualitative and interdisciplinary in nature, centers on experiences, narratives, and technologies related to health and illness, along with other material aspects. Presently, she is intrigued by collaborations among science, art, and communities, investigating the impact of artificial intelligence on the narratives we construct and the realities we shape. Besides her academic pursuits, she is also an illustrator, a practice that influences her academic work. Additionally, she is a poet and lyricist, with work published in three albums, one EP, and four compilations of Portuguese music.

== Contributions and research ==
Author of three research monographs, book chapters, and scientific articles, exploring representations of illness, technologies, and biomedical materialities in visual arts, she pioneered the study of art and material culture of oncological illness in Portugal, her field of work since 2005. Recognized for her dozens of published scientific illustrations, she is responsible for introducing a new methodology called creative ethnographic drawing, revitalizing this practice through the use of metaphor and imagination, expanding the forms of production within the social sciences. Her work has already earned her several invitations to universities and appearances in the national media.

=== Published work ===
==== A Tinta, a Mariposa e a Metástase: a Arte como Experiência, Conhecimento e Ação sobre o Cancro de Mama ====
In her first work, published in 2009, the researcher analyzes and comments on 24 artistic projects produced by women, all related to the female experience of breast cancer. The author approaches art as an integral part of the lived experience of the disease, exploring how it shapes how cancer is experienced, understood, and faced. From diagnosis to surgical experiences, Noronha portrays how art is used as a tool of expression by women facing cancer. Through a variety of artistic forms, including photography, painting, drawing, sculpture, and collage, the author demonstrates how art can be a form of knowledge and intervention, both individually and collectively. By blending empirical, biomedical, and social knowledge, the artists redefine the experience of cancer as a socially constructed reality, beyond the traditional medical perspective.

==== Objetos Feitos de Cancro - Mulheres, Cultura Material e Doença nas Estórias da Arte ====
In her second work, published in 2015, the author investigated the material culture of oncological illness, examining the materialities present in artistic projects created by or with women who have experienced cancer. The author explores how hospital, household, and personal objects intertwine with different stages of the disease, from diagnosis to death. By considering a wide range of artistic forms, including photography, painting, drawing, collage, modeling, sculpture, and sewing, Noronha illustrates how illness manifests as a modular experience, while objects exist and act as embeddable realities within that context. This theoretical and methodological approach continues to depict the intersection between art, illness, and material culture.

==== Cancro Sobre Papel: estórias de oito mulheres portuguesas entre palavra falada, arte e ciência escrita ====
In the final piece of her trilogy, published in 2019, Susana de Noronha gathers experiences and stories from eight Portuguese women with cancer, utilizing a qualitative, intersubjective, and transdisciplinary approach. Integrating knowledge of the body, spoken word, creative writing, photography, drawing, and painting, this project seeks an ontological, epistemological, and performative understanding of art as an integral part of the cancer experience. The researcher reflects on the elements that shape women's experiences, combining text and image to create an illustrated social science that enhances the impact and public outcomes of the research.

== Artistic career ==
Susana de Noronha's artistic journey began in childhood, where drawing people, objects, and events became an integral part of her life. Throughout adolescence, as a student of art and design, her sketchbooks were filled with intricate representations of eyes, faces, hands, and trees, each serving as central themes reflecting her evolving artistic style. Drawing essentially became a defining aspect of her identity and potential. Transitioning into her career as an anthropologist, Susana de Noronha integrated her creative skills into her academic pursuits, reshaping traditional notions of social sciences, scientific illustration, and ethnographic drawing. Far from being just a complement to her professional activities, art formed the foundation of her research methodology. Although she may not identify as an artist in the traditional sense, she sees herself as a social scientist who uses art as a means to both understand and engage with her subjects of study. In her academic work, Susana de Noronha has produced a diverse variety of illustrations, each one imbued with metaphor and imagination, enriching the discourse within her field. These illustrations serve as visual narratives, complementing and enhancing the written content of essays, articles, and book chapters. In her artistic career, she has also produced poems and lyrics, writing various songs for the projects At Freddy’s House and Pyroscaphe.

== Bibliography ==
- NORONHA, Susana de – A tinta, a mariposa e a metástase: a arte como experiência, conhecimento e acção sobre o cancro da mama. Porto : Afrontamento, 2009.
- NORONHA, Susana de – Cancro, arte e ação: experiências e projetos de mulheres e homens Portugueses. Configurações [On-line]. ISSN 2182-7419. 22 (Dez. 2018) 101–116. doi:10.4000/configuracoes.6097
- NORONHA, Susana de – Cancro sobre papel: estórias de oito mulheres portuguesas entre palavra falada, arte e ciência escrita. Coimbra : Almedina, 2019. ISBN 978-972-40-7878-6.
- NORONHA, Susana de – Comentário à crónica «Bloqueio em Movimento» (Visão, 12 de junho de 2003). In Boaventura de Sousa Santos, A Cor do Tempo Quando Foge Vol. 2. 2.^{a} ed. Coimbra : Almedina, 2012. ISBN 978-972-40-4800-0. p. 132.
- NORONHA, Susana de – Comentário à crónica «Uma Sociedade em Busca de Medida» (Visão, 7 de março de 2002). In Boaventura de Sousa Santos, A Cor do Tempo Quando Foge Vol. 2. 2.^{a} ed. Coimbra : Almedina, 2012. ISBN 978-972-40-4800-0. p. 57.
- NORONHA, Susana de – Duas Mulheres, a Câmara e o Bisturi: (re)misturas entre o incorporado, o artístico e o biomédico na experiência do cancro de mama. POP/ Publicação Oncológica Portuguesa. 2 (2010).
- NORONHA, Susana de – Emotions/ Emoções (bilingue). In Dicionário ALICE [On-line]. Coimbra : CES-ALICE, 2019. Available at WWW: <URL:https://alice.ces.uc.pt/dictionary/?id=23838&pag=23918&id_lingua=2&entry=24276>. ISBN 978-989-8847-08-9.
- NORONHA, Susana de – Fotografías hechas de cáncer: el arte como pedazo de enfermedad en los relatos de mujeres. In La imagen desvelada: Prácticas fotográficas en la enfermedad, la muerte y el duelo. Barcelona : Sans Soleil Ediciones, 2019. ISBN 978-84-120097-4-3. p. 79-122.
- NORONHA, Susana de – Metástases de um texto antropológico escrito entre mulheres, arte(s) e cancros da mama. In Semióticas da Comunicação Intercultural. Porto : Afrontamento, 2015. ISBN 978-972-36-1441-1.
- NORONHA, Susana de – Mulheres em morte-cor: os objetos que fazem e desfazem corpos e cancros metastáticos. Saúde & Tecnologia. ISSN 1646-9704. Suplemento (Mar. 2013) 33–37.
- NORONHA, Susana de – Na terceira metade das coisas e do conhecimento: o desejo de um outro conceito e experiência de doença na arte de mulheres com cancro [The third half of things and of knowledge: the desire for an alternative concept and experience of illness in the art of women with cancer]. In Saúde e Cyborgs: Cuidar na Era da Medicina Biotecnológica. Porto : Fronteira do Caos, 2019. ISBN 978-989-8911-52-0.
- NORONHA, Susana de – Objetos feitos de cancro: mulheres, cultura material e doença nas estórias da arte. Coimbra : Almedina, 2015.
- NORONHA, Susana de – Radiant: understanding endometrial cancer, vaginal brachytherapy and motherhood through words and images. Revista Ñanduty [On-line]. ISSN 2317-8590. 7:11 (Dez. 2019) 104–134. doi:10.30612/nty.v7i11.10768
- NORONHA, Susana de – Sarcoma e amputação de um braço esquerdo: da (in)capacidade a um outro uso do coto, do corpo e dos objetos do trabalho. In Experiência, Saúde, Cronicidade: um olhar socioantropológico. Brasil: Fiocruz, 2021. ISBN 978-65-5708-036-8.
- NORONHA, Susana de – The chairs of hereditary cancer: understanding time and illness using creative ethnographic drawing. Comunicação e Sociedade [On-line]. ISSN 2183-3575. 35 (Jun. 2019) 153–171. doi:10.17231/comsoc.35(2019).3136
- NORONHA, Susana de – (Un)stitching the Memory and the Story of a Melanoma: Giving a Form to Forgetfulness between Anthropology and Creative Ethnographic Drawing. Cadernos de arte e antropologia [On-line]. ISSN 2238-0361. Vol. 8, No 2 (Nov. 2018) 73–79. doi:10.4000/cadernosaa.2500
- NORONHA, Susana de – Witchcraft and Cancer in the Narrative of a Portuguese Woman. Medical Anthropology [On-line]. ISSN 1545-5882. 41:2 (Jan. 2022) 243–255. doi:10.1080/01459740.2022.2025590
- NORONHA, Susana de; MENESES, Maria Paula; NUNES, João Arriscado - Health and the Epistemologies of the South. In CES, Saúde e Epistemologias do Sul. Coimbra : CES, 2019.
