= Hjulström curve =

Method for determining sediment motion in rivers

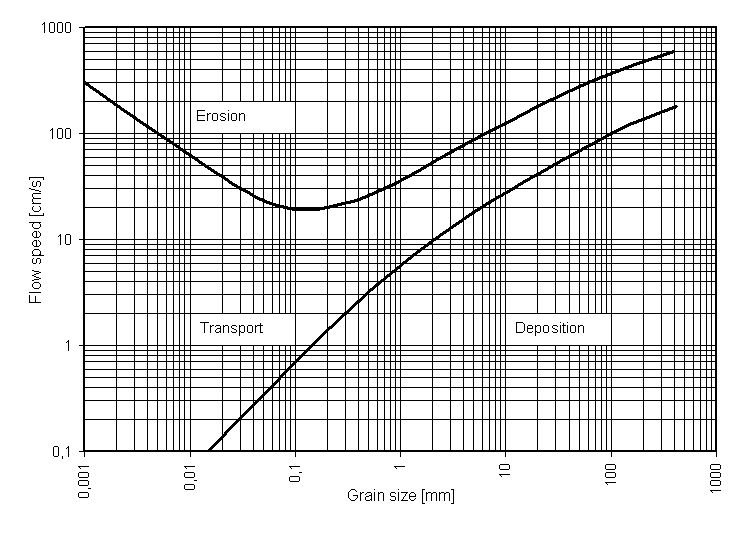
The Hjulström curve

The Hjulström curve, named after Filip Hjulström (1902–1982), is a graph used by hydrologists and geologists to determine whether a river will erode, transport, or deposit sediment. It was originally published in his doctoral thesis "Studies of the morphological activity of rivers as illustrated by the river Fyris." in 1935. The graph takes sediment particle size and water velocity into account.

The upper curve shows the critical erosion velocity in cm/s as a function of particle size in mm, while the lower curve shows the deposition velocity as a function of particle size. Note that the axes are logarithmic.

The plot shows several key concepts about the relationships between erosion, transportation, and deposition. For particle sizes where friction is the dominating force preventing erosion, the curves follow each other closely and the required velocity increases with particle size. However, for cohesive sediment, mostly clay but also silt, the erosion velocity increases with decreasing grain size, as the cohesive forces are relatively more important when the particles get smaller. The critical velocity for deposition, on the other hand, depends on the settling velocity, and that decreases with decreasing grainsize. The Hjulström curve shows that sand particles of a size around 0.1 mm require the lowest stream velocity to erode.

The curve was expanded by Åke Sundborg in 1956. He significantly improved the level of detail in the cohesive part of the diagram, and added lines for different modes of transportation. The result is called the Sundborg diagram, or the Hjulström-Sundborg Diagram, in the academic literature.

This curve dates back to early 20th century research on river geomorphology and has no more than a historical value nowadays, although its simplicity is still attractive. Among the drawbacks of this curve are that it does not take the water depth into account and more importantly, that it does not show that sedimentation is caused by flow velocity deceleration and erosion is caused by flow acceleration. The dimensionless Shields Diagram, in combination with the Shields formula is now unanimously accepted for initiation of sediment motion in rivers. Much work was done on river sediment transport formulae in the second half of the 20th century and that work should be used preferably to Hjulström's curve.

== See also ==
- Sediment transport
  - Sediment_transport#Hjulström–Sundborg_diagram
