= Emily Martin (anthropologist) =

American academic (born 1944)

Emily Martin (born 1944) is an American anthropologist. She is a professor emerita of socio-cultural anthropology at New York University. She received her undergraduate degree from the University of Michigan in 1966 and her PhD from Cornell University in 1971. Before 1984, she published works under the name of Emily Martin Ahern.

== Career ==
=== Teaching and academic work ===
After earning a PhD in anthropology, Martin was on the faculty of the University of California, Irvine and Yale University. In 1974, she joined the faculty of Johns Hopkins University and held the position of Mary Elizabeth Garrett Professor of Arts and Sciences between 1981 and 1994. She was a professor at Princeton University from 1994 to 2001 before accepting a position as professor at New York University.

Martin was the founding editor of the journal Anthropology Now. In 2019, she was awarded the Vega Medal by the Swedish Society for Anthropology and Geography in recognition of her contributions to anthropology. In the same year she was also awarded the John Desmond Bernal Prize by the Society for Social Studies of Science.

=== Sinology ===
Martin's work on sinology focused on topics both in Mainland China and Taiwan, including religion, architecture, politics, traditional Chinese medicine, women, rural culture, and genealogies.

=== Feminist anthropology of science ===
Martin studies the anthropology of science from a feminist perspective. Martin argues that current scientific literature is gender-biased and that such bias has become entrenched in our language. According to Martin, scientific explanations are presented in a sexist way.

Martin began researching the analogies used in science education starting in 1982. Pregnant with her second child, Martin noticed patterns in her expecting parents' class with how women's bodies were described and referred to. Martin began her research with interviews with women regarding their perspective on female reproductive issues and compiled her research of interviews into a book called The Woman in the Body (1987). Martin began to expand on her research by interviewing scientists and including the topic of male reproductive processes. These topics were elaborated on in Martin's article "The Egg and the Sperm: How Science Has Constructed a Romance Based on Stereotypical Male-Female Roles" (1991).

=== Bipolar disorder ===
Martin drew on her own experience with bipolar disorder to write Bipolar Expeditions: Mania and Depression in American Culture. In it, she argues that mania and depression have a cultural life outside the confines of psychiatry and that the extremes of mood which might be dubbed "irrational" are also present in the more "rational" parts of American life, like economics and the stock market. The book was the winner of the 2009 Diana Forsythe Prize for the best book of feminist anthropology.

== Notable works ==
=== The Woman in the Body ===
Martin's book The Woman in the Body won the first Eileen Basker Memorial Prize from the Society for Medical Anthropology. The book was first published in 1987 and then re-published in 2001 by Beacon Press with a new introduction. In this book Martin examines how American culture sees the process of reproduction. Martin explains how women's bodies are seen as machines for creating children. This creates a dichotomy that connects women to their bodies, while men are more connected to their minds. The hospital's focus is not on the experience of the woman in labor but on creating a predictable experience that gets the woman out of the hospital quickly to continue to work as a machine and produce value in the workforce. Martin proposes that all people in the workforce need to be treated better and accommodated for personal circumstances. Her argument is that women are easier to target in the workplace because their behaviors are attributed to their menstrual cycles.

Reviewing the book in American Anthropologist, Linda C. Garrow wrote: "Martin draws strong conclusions about the amount of resistance expressed by women that are not supported by the data [...] However, the insights, hypotheses, and challenges [...] will undoubtedly stimulate much research and make the book essential reading across a number of areas in medical anthropology." In Isis, Anja Hiddinga called it "daring, well argued, and thoroughly supported by a wide range of references."

=== "The Egg and the Sperm" ===
In the 1991 article, "The Egg and the Sperm: How Science Has Constructed a Romance Based on Stereotypical Male-Female Roles", Martin analyzes the metaphors that are used to teach biological concepts, claiming that these metaphors reflect the socially constructed definitions of male and female. She focuses on analogies made about fertilization and the egg and sperm's roles, and points how the language used insinuates that female biological processes are inferior to male biological processes.

Martin notes that the perception of menstruation is usually negative and misogynistic and that women tend to think of menstruation as a failure. Martin ascribes this perception to linguistic and cultural gender bias; words used to describe menstruation imply failure, dirtiness, structural breakdown, and destruction. Martin contends that menstruation is a normal physiological function and process which should be viewed as a success in avoiding pregnancy and ridding itself of potentially harmful material from the uterus. She says that gender bias is also responsible for Western culture's tendency to praise men for the ability to produce a large amount of sperm.

In Martin's view, the way the egg is discussed reinforces the culture's view of a passive damsel in distress while the sperm races to the egg to penetrate it. Martin suggests alternative descriptions of fertilization that give the egg a less passive role. She notes that research has shown that the sperm does not have a powerful thrust, and fertilization occurs because the egg traps the sperm. Furthermore, she notes that work by Paul Wassarman (conducted on the sperm and eggs of mice) singled out a particular molecule on the egg coat which binds the sperm. This molecule was called a "sperm receptor" which has passive connotations, whereas the corresponding molecule on the sperm is called the "egg binding protein". Martin sees this as one of many examples of sexist language entrenched in the imagery of reproduction, with the sperm consistently placed in the role of aggressor despite research which points otherwise.

== Personal life ==
Martin has a husband, Richard Cone, who is a professor emeritus at Johns Hopkins University. The couple has two daughters.
