= Avalanche boulder tongue =

An avalanche boulder tongue is an accumulation of debris produced by snow avalanches. Well-developed avalanche boulder tongues usually develop below avalanche gullies due to successive avalanches over a long time span. The avalanche boulder tongues were first intensively investigated by Anders Rapp in the areas of Abisko and Kebnekaise in Swedish Lappland.
