= Filip Hjulström =

Swedish geographer

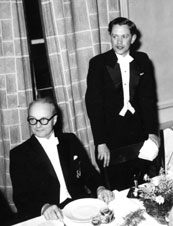
- Filip Hjulström (left) and Åke Sundborg, 1957.
- Born: 6 October 1902; Lungsund
- Died: 26 March 1982 (aged 79); Uppsala
- Citizenship: Sweden
- Known for: Process geomorphology Hjulström curve
- Awards: Vega Medal (1970)
- Scientific career
- Fields: Geomorphology
- Workplaces: Uppsala University
- Doctoral students: Valter Axelsson; John O. Norrman; Anders Rapp; Åke Sundborg

Henning Filip Hjulström (6 October 1902 – 26 March 1982) was a Swedish geographer. Hjulström was professor of geography at Uppsala University from 1944, and in 1949, when the subject of geography was split, he became professor of Physical Geography.

Filip Hjulström's doctoral thesis, "The River Fyris", contained one of the first quantitative studies of geomorphological processes ever published. It was a study of sediment transport and soil erosion in the drainage area of the river Fyrisån, based on a daily water sample that he took as he passed on the way to the department, and analyzed for suspended sediment content. His students followed in the same vein, making quantitative studies of mass transport (Anders Rapp), fluvial transport (Åke Sundborg), delta deposition (Valter Axelsson), and coastal processes (John O. Norrman). This developed into "the Uppsala School of Physical Geography".

Hjulström is most known for creating the Hjulström curve, which describes the thresholds for erosion and deposition of particles in running water.

== Family ==
Hjulström's son Lennart Hjulström went on to become a notable Swedish actor that had two children with Ulla (née Söderdal), Niklas Hjulström and Carin Hjulström, also actors. Lennart also had a child, Hannah Nyroos with his current wife, Gunilla Nyroos, an actress.
