= Swedish Society for Anthropology and Geography =

Scientific learned society founded in December 1877

The Swedish Society for Anthropology and Geography (SSAG; Swedish: Svenska Sällskapet för Antropologi och Geografi) is a scientific learned society founded in December 1877. It was established after a rearrangement of various sections of the Anthropological Society, which was formed in 1873 by Hjalmar Stolpe, Hans Hildebrand, Oscar Montelius, and Gustaf Retzius.

The society functions as a link between science and the public, especially in the subjects of anthropology and geography. It awards research fellowships, organizes excursions and lectures, and hands out awards including the Vega Medal and Retzius Medal. In 1880, the society published the first edition of the Swedish yearbook Ymer, and it has published the international journal Geografiska Annaler since 1919, a publication that is divided between physical geography and human geography.

In 2018, it established Kritisk Etnografi, an academic journal of ethnography.

== Society awards ==
The society created the Vega Medal in 1881, on the occasion of Adolf Erik Nordenskiöld's return to Stockholm after the Vega expedition – his discovery of the Northeast Passage. Since then, the Vega Medal has been awarded to an outstanding physical geographer roughly every three years. In the intervening years, the society has awarded the Anders Retzius Medal to a geographer or anthropologist.

In 2015, the Society decided that awarding a medal named after Retzius was inappropriate; his racial studies—including a collection of skulls of indigenous peoples—are viewed with disapproval by modern anthropologists. Thereafter, the Retzius Medal was renamed the SSAG medal, and it was given to Didier Fassin in 2016. The society's awards are handed out by the King of Sweden on 24 April, the anniversary of Nordenskiöld's return to Stockholm.

== Recipients ==
The following people are among the recipients of the society's awards:

=== Vega Medal ===
- 1881: Adolf Erik Nordenskiöld
- 1882: Louis Palander
- 1883: Henry Morton Stanley
- 1884: Nikolai Przhevalsky
- 1888: Wilhelm Junker
- 1889: Fridtjof Nansen
- 1890: Emin Pasha
- 1892: Louis Gustave Binger
- 1897: Otto Sverdrup
- 1898: Sven Hedin
- 1899: Georg August Schweinfurth
- 1900: Alfred Gabriel Nathorst
- 1901: Prince Luigi Amedeo
- 1903: Ferdinand von Richthofen
- 1904: Otto Nordenskiöld
- Johan G. Andersson
- 1905: Robert Falcon Scott
- 1907: Otto Pettersson
- 1909: Johan Peter Koch
- 1910: Ernest Shackleton
- 1912: John Murray
- 1913: Roald Amundsen
- 1915: Gerard De Geer
- 1919: Knud Johan Victor Rasmussen
- 1920: William Morris Davis
- 1922: Albert I, Prince of Monaco
- 1923: Albrecht Penck
- 1924: Lauge Koch
- 1926: Boris Vilkitsky
- 1930: Harald Sverdrup
- 1931: Émile-Félix Gautier
- 1932: Albert Defant
- 1937: Roy Chapman Andrews
- 1939: Vilhelm Bjerknes
- Vagn W. Ekman
- 1941: Bjørn Helland-Hansen
- Hans W. Ahlmann
- 1944: Lennart von Post
- 1946: Emmanuel de Martonne
- 1948: Richard Evelyn Byrd
- 1950: Hans Pettersson
- 1951: Carl Troll
- 1954: Laurence Dudley Stamp
- 1955: Paul-Émile Victor
- 1957: Carl O. Sauer
- 1958: Jacob Bjerknes
- Tor Bergeron
- 1959: Mikhail Somov
- 1961: Richard Joel Russell
- 1962: Thor Heyerdahl
- 1963: Louis Leakey
- 1965: Maurice Ewing
- 1970: Filip Hjulström
- Sigurður Þórarinsson
- 1972: Albert P. Crary
- 1975: Willi Dansgaard
- 1981: Valter Schytt
- 1983: Cesare Emiliani
- 1984: Hubert Lamb
- 1986: John Ross Mackay
- 1987: Gunnar Hoppe
- Åke Sundborg
- 1990: George H. Denton
- 1993: David E. Sugden
- 1994: Gösta Hjalmar Liljequist
- 1997: Albert Lincoln Washburn
- 1999: John Imbrie
- 2002: Lonnie Thompson
- 2005: Françoise Gasse
- 2008: Dorthe Dahl-Jensen
- 2011: Terry Callaghan
- 2014: Compton J. Tucker
- 2015: Lesley Head
- 2017: Yao Tandong
- 2018: Gillian Hart
- 2020: David R. Montgomery
- 2021: Anssi Paasi
- 2023: John Smol

=== Retzius Medal ===
- 1913: Oscar Montelius
- 1920: Arthur Evans
- 1923: Aurel Stein
- 1925: Johan Gunnar Andersson
- 1930: Erland Nordenskiöld
- 1951: Vernon Victor Hickman
- 1967: Walter Christaller
- 1969: David Hannerberg
- 1973: Torsten Hägerstrand
- 1976: William William-Olsson
- 1978: Wolfgang Hartke
- 1985: Akin Mabogunje
- 1988: Fredrik Barth
- 1989: David Harvey
- Sven Godlund
- 1991: Allan Pred
- 1992: Jack Goody
- 1994: Peter Haggett
- 1995: Veena Das
- 1997: Peter Gould
- 1998: David Maybury-Lewis
- 2000: Erik Bylund
- 2001: Sherry Ortner
- 2003: Doreen Massey
- 2004: Tim Ingold
- 2006: Gunnar Törnqvist
- 2007: John and Jean Comaroff
- 2009: Allen J. Scott
- 2010: Ulf Hannerz
- 2012: Don Mitchell
- 2013: Paul Stoller

=== Gold Medal ===
- 2016: Didier Fassin
- 2019: Emily Martin
- 2022: Thomas Hylland Eriksen

== Kritisk Etnografi ==
Kritisk Etnografi
- Discipline: Social anthropology, ethnography
- Language: English
- Edited by: Sten Hagberg, Jörgen Hellman

Publication details
- History: 2018–present
- Publisher: Swedish Society for Anthropology and Geography (SSAG); Academic Archive Online (DiVa)
- Frequency: Biannually
- Open access: Yes

Standard abbreviations
- ISO 4: Krit. Etnogr.

Indexing
- ISSN: 2003-1173
- OCLC no.: 1048148325

Links
- Journal homepage; Academic Archive Online

Kritisk Etnografi (Swedish for "critical ethnography"), subtitled Swedish Journal of Anthropology, is a bi-annual peer-reviewed, open-access, online-only, academic journal on the subjects of anthropology and ethnography, owned and published by the Swedish Society for Anthropology and Geography in collaboration with DiVA, an online archive maintained by Uppsala University. Its first issue was launched on 15 August 2018.

== See also ==
- List of geographical societies
- List of anthropology awards
- List of geography awards
