= Rissajaure =

Lake in Kiruna Municipality, Sweden

Geargejaure
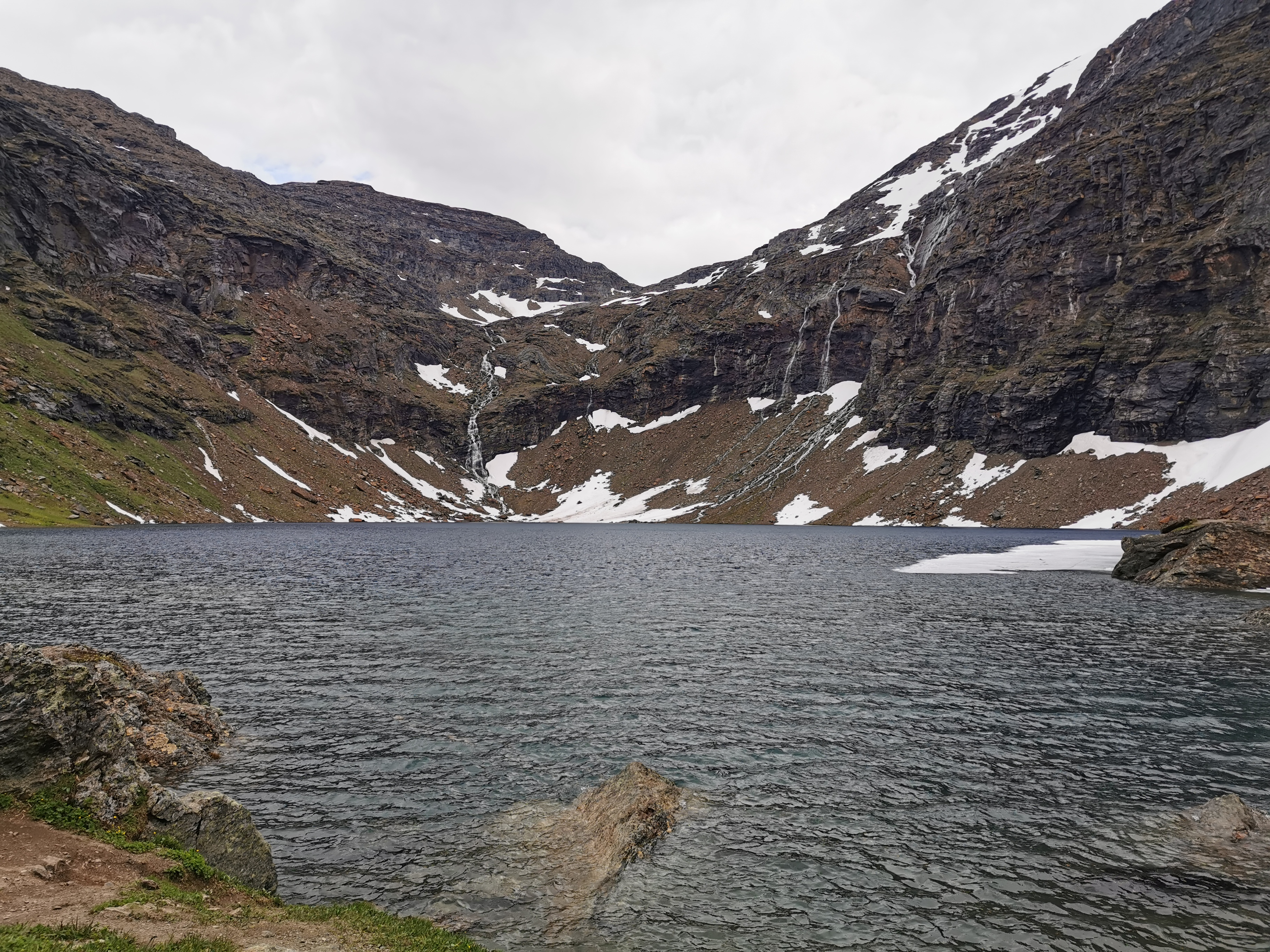

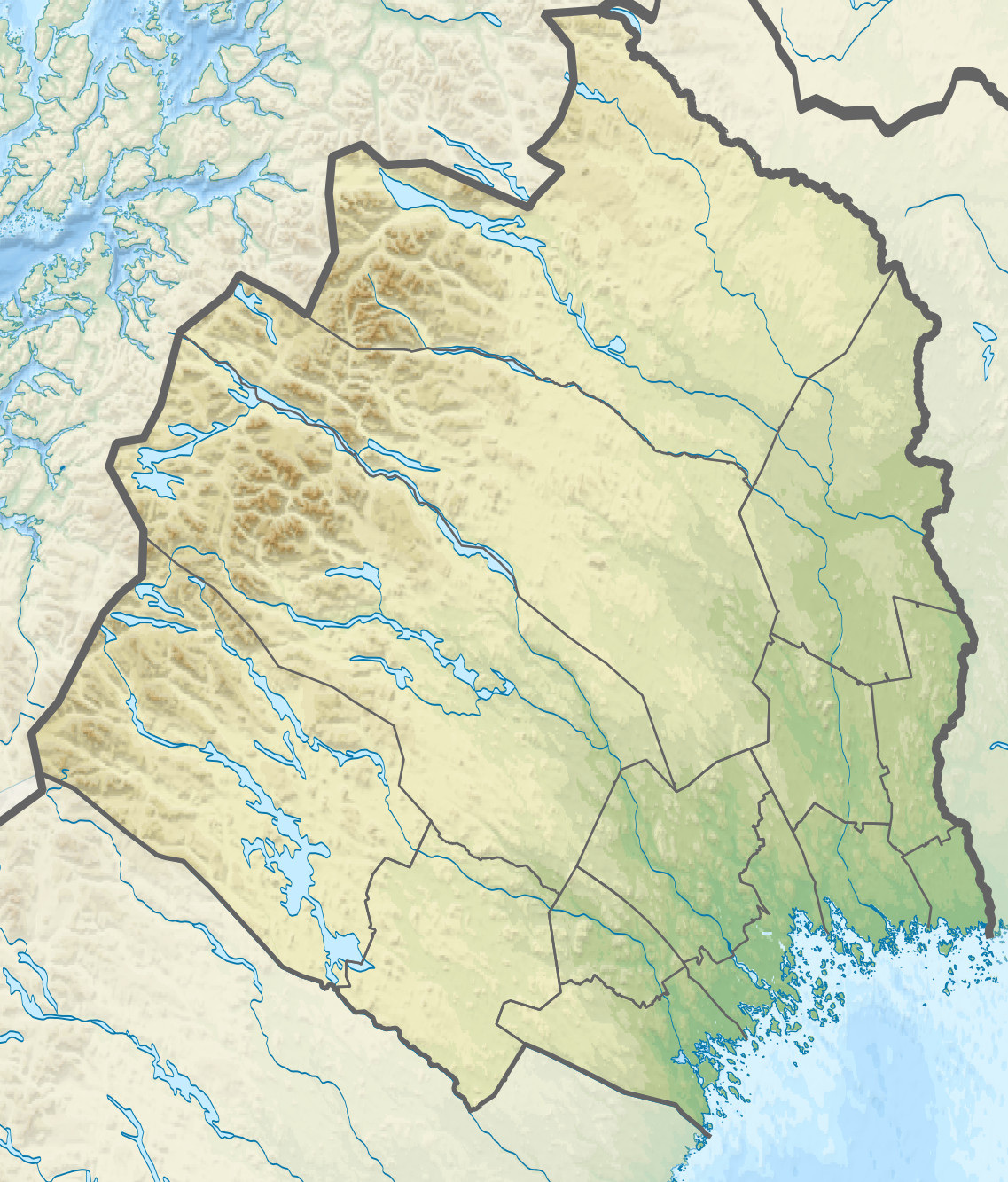
- Location within Norrbotten Location within Sweden
- Location: Kärkevagge, Kiruna Municipality
- Coordinates: 68°23′N 18°20′E
- Basin countries: Sweden
- Max. depth: 34 m (112 ft)
- Surface elevation: 815 m (2,674 ft)

Geargejaure, also called Trollsjön and sometimes Kärkevaggepadajaure, (Northern Sami: Geargejávri) is a lake in the Kärkevagge valley in Kiruna Municipality, Sweden. It is the clearest and purest lake in Sweden and has a visual depth of 34 m, right down to the bottom. It is located about 120 km from Kiruna. It is composed of meltwater from the surrounding glaciers. The lake is ice-covered well into the summer and is only ice-free for three months.
