= Kärkevagge =

Valley in northern Sweden

- Geargevággi
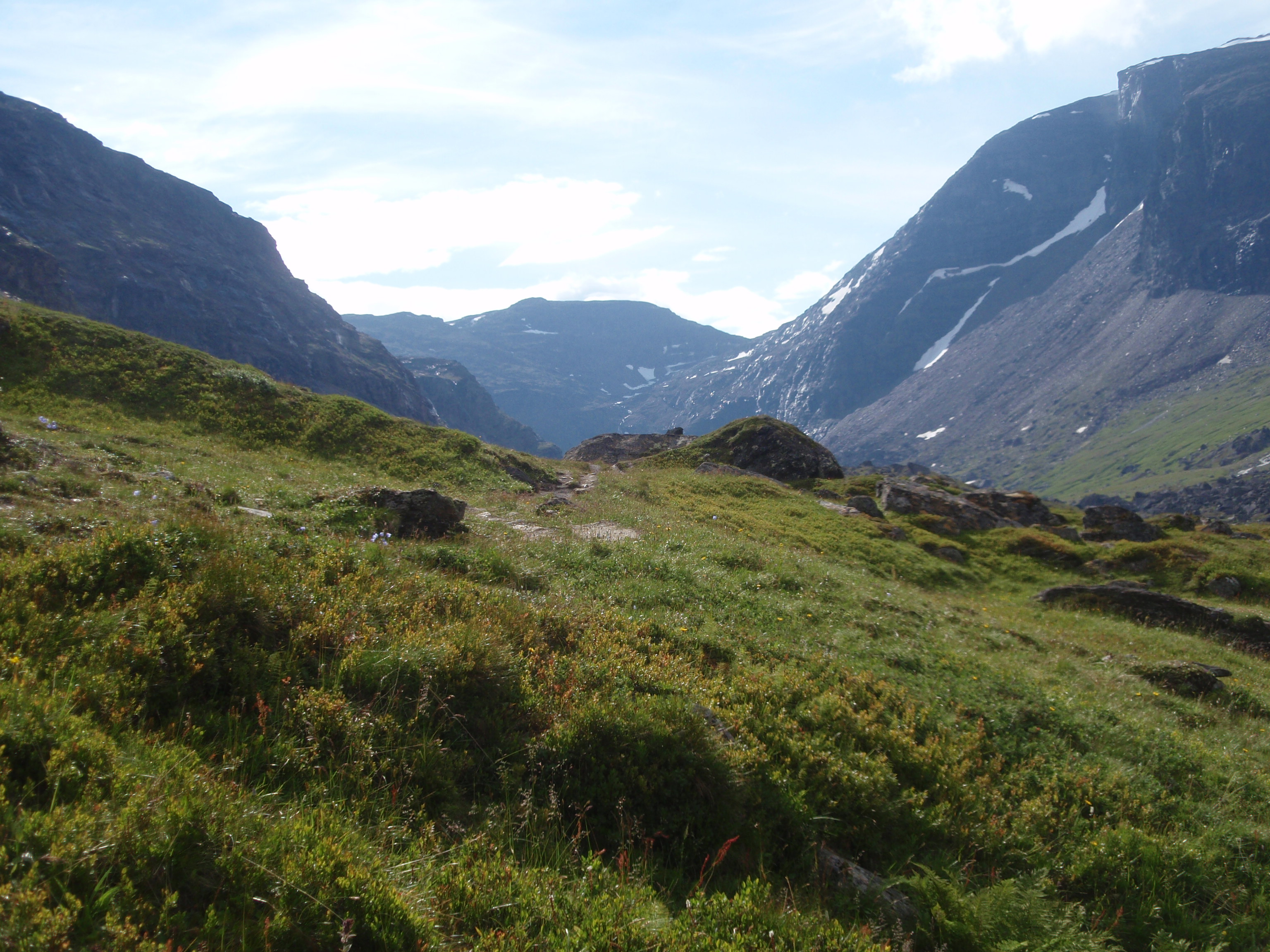
- Length: 4 kilometres (2.5 mi)

Geography
- Location: Sweden, Norrbotten, Kiruna
- Coordinates: 68.40183°N 18.31009°E
- Interactive map of Kärkevagge

Kärkevagge (Northern Sami: Geargevággi, "Stone Valley") is a short (4 km long) valley in Kiruna Municipality, Sweden. It is easily accessed by a good path from the E10 Kiruna-Narvik highway. Rissajaure, the clearest lake in Sweden, is located at the head of the valley. Karkevagge is noted for the Giant Boulder Deposit (GBD) which fills it with huge jumbled blocks, some the size of houses. One of Sweden's leading geoscientists, Anders Rapp, a world pioneer of quantitative geomorphology, studied the valley for 10 years. He suggested that the parallel rows of blocks had descended in waves from the valleyside cliffs. He estimated the volume of the GBD at 50 million cubic metres. However a large angular cavity beside Rissajaure (top right in picture) has a volume of 42 million cubic metres. The GBD probably descended from it as a rock avalanche and spread down the valley on a glacier, giving it a moraine-like form and visual unity as seen from the air.
