= Gustavo Cardoso =

Portuguese academic

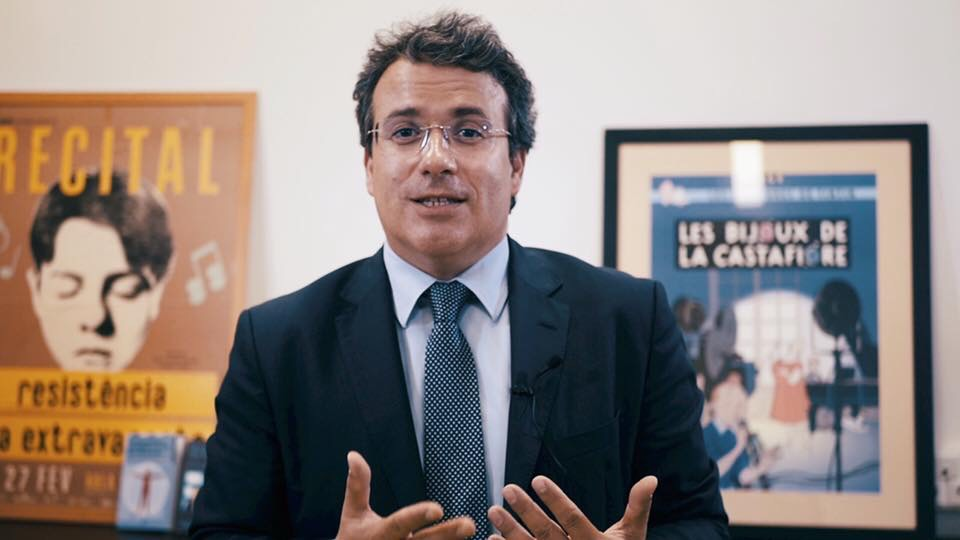
- Education: ISCTE - Lisbon University Institute
- Occupation: Professor
- Employer: ISCTE - Lisbon University Institute
- Website: Academic Bio

Gustavo Cardoso is Full Professor of Communication Sciences at ISCTE - Lisbon University Institute, Portugal and a member of the Innovation Lab Annenberg School of Communication and World Internet Project both based at the University of Southern California.

He was also a visiting professor at the IN3 in Barcelona and Directeur d'Études Associes at FMSH Paris. Currently he directs the Doctoral Program in Communication Sciences at ISCTE-IUL and the Postdegree in Journalism in the same institution. He is also member of the Board of OberCom (Communication Observatory) and editor-in-chief of OBS Journal. His reflection analysis on politics, economics and Portuguese culture include "O Poder de Mudar" (Tinta da China, 2014) and "Inovar Portugal: 20 ideas para 2020" (Campo das letras, 2005).

His research in the communication studies include "The Media in the Network Society" (Calouste Gulbenkian Foundation in Portugal; FGV in Brazil, and UOC Press in Spain) and the edited volumes "Network Society : From Knowledge to Policy "(Johns Hopkins University, 2006)," World Wide Internet: Changing Societies, Economies and Culture 's (University of Macau Press, 2010.) "Aftermath" (Oxford University Press 2012 ), "A Sociedade dos Ecrãs" (Tinta da China, 2013), "Piracy Cultures" (IJOC, 2014), "O livro, o leitor e a leitura digital" (Fundação Calouste Gulbenkian, 2015) and "A Sociedade em Rede em Portugal: uma década de transição" (Almedina, 2015). Since 2013 he is a member of the research network "The Crisis of Europe", hosted by the College d'Études Mondiales, on the political, cultural and economic changes underway in European societies and in the European Union. Regular columnist in the Portuguese newspaper Público he also comments weekly in the News Channel TVI24 on emerging issues in the current political, economic and cultural dimensions.

== Recent publications ==
- Cardoso, Gustavo and Di Fátima, Branco (2013), Movimento em rede e protestos no Brasil. Qual gigante acordou?, Revista Eco-Pós, Dossiê Mídia, Intelectuais e Política, Vol. 16, N.º 2, Rio de Janeiro: UFRJ.
- Cardoso, Gustavo, João Caraça, Rita Espanha and Sandro Mendonça (2010), "The Politics of Open Access", in Dutton, William H. e Paul W. Jeffreys, World Wide Research - Reshaping the Sciences and Humanities. Cambridge, MA: The MIT Press.
- Cardoso, Gustavo e Rita Espanha (2009), "The Users' Shaping of Networked Communication", in J. Pierson, E.A. Mante-Meijer, E.F. Loos & B. Sapio (org.), (2009) Innovation for/by users. Brussel, COST-Opoce.
- World Wide Internet: Changing Societies, Economies and Cultures. Cardoso, Gustavo, Angus Cheong e Jeffrey Cole (eds.) (2009), Macau, University of Macau.
