= Paul Stoller =

American cultural anthropologist

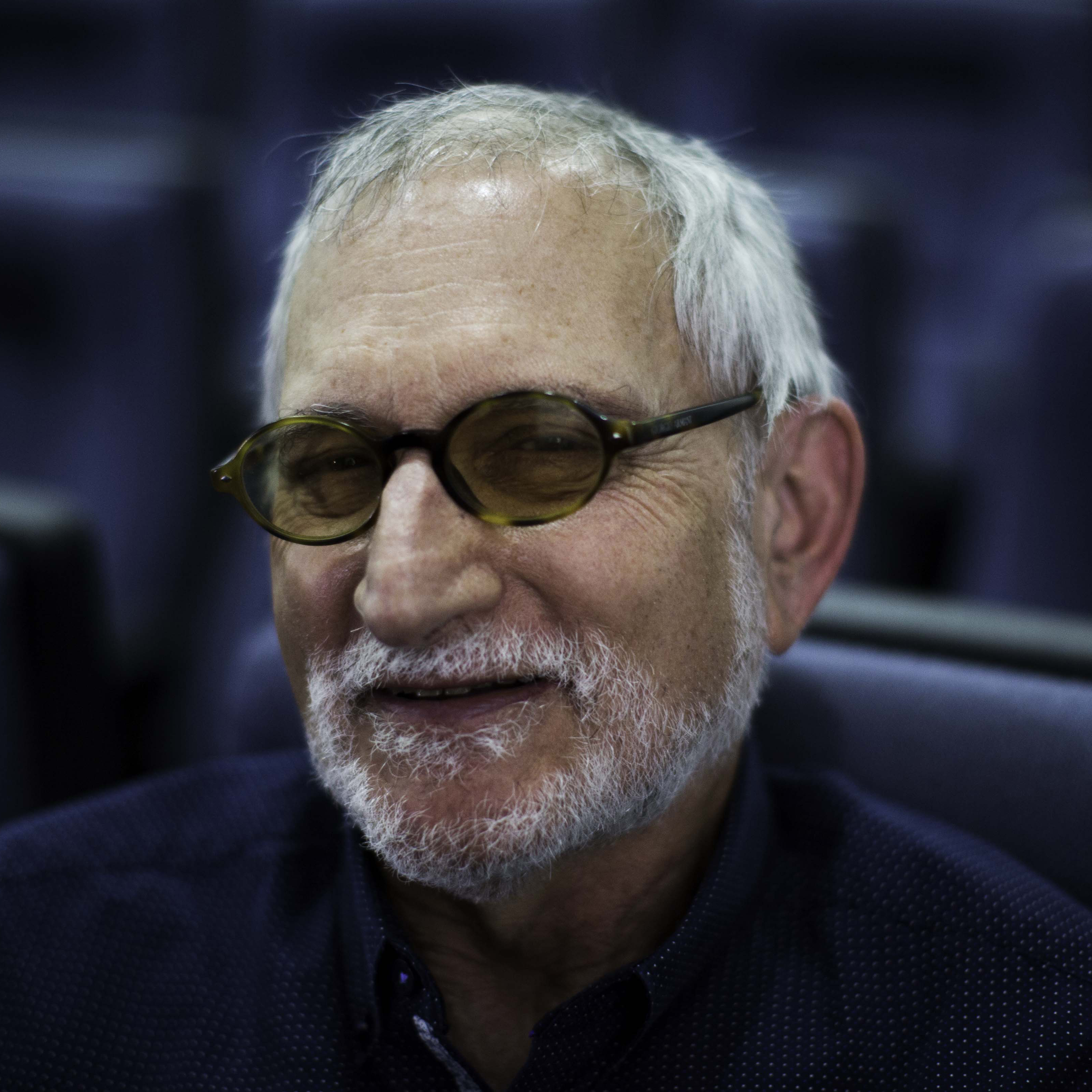
Paul Stoller in 2018.

Paul Stoller (born January 25, 1947) is an American cultural anthropologist. He is a professor of anthropology at West Chester University in West Chester, Pennsylvania.

== Biography ==
Stoller received his B.A degree in political science at the University of Pittsburgh in 1969. He joined the Peace Corps after graduation. Placed in Niger, he taught English to the Songhay until he left in 1971. In 1974, he earned an MS in sociolinguistics at Georgetown University. In 1978, Stoller obtained his Ph.D. in anthropology from the University of Texas at Austin with his field research on religious practices among the Songhay in Tillaberi and Mehanna and Wanzerbe in the Republic of Niger and Mali. More specifically, his work has focused on magic, sorcery and spirit possession. In 1992, he began to conduct fieldwork among West African immigrants in New York City.

Over the course of his 30 years career in anthropology, Stoller has been the recipient of numerous academic awards and grants from Wenner-Gren Foundation, Fulbright-Hays, National Science Foundation as well as the American Philosophical Society and the National Endowment for the Humanities. In 1994, he received a John Simon Guggenheim Fellowship. Out of his research, Stoller has published eleven books including ethnographies, biographies, memoirs and novels as well as copious articles that have been nominated for awards. His 1987 book, Fusion of the Worlds: Ethnography of Possession Among the Songhay of Niger was nominated for the J.I. Staley Prize. In 1992, The Cinematic Griot: The Ethnography of Jean Rouch was a finalist for the Herskovits Prize. In this examination of the documentary filmmaker and ethnographer, Stoller offers insights into the controversial pioneer of cinema verité arguing that Rouch's films blended artful narrative with grounded ethnography to produce an aesthetic fusion known as ethno-fiction. To date, other than Jean Rouch, Stoller has conducted more fieldwork among the Songhay than any other anthropologists. His ethnography of African street traders in New York City, Money Has No Smell: The Africanization of New York City was the winner of the American Anthropological Association's Robert B. Textor Prize in Anticipatory Anthropology. It was also nominated for the J.I. Staley Prize.

In 2013, The Swedish Society for Anthropology and Geography selected him to receive the Anders Retzius Medal in Gold for his scientific contributions to anthropology. He received the award on April 26, 2013.

== Theoretical contributions ==
With his publications of The Taste of Ethnographic Things: The Senses in Anthropology (1989) and Sensuous Scholarship (1997), Stoller has been at the forefront of the Anthropology of the Senses also known as sensory anthropology. He is an advocate of research methods grounded in long term fieldwork, cultural relativism and reflexivity. In a review in Anthropology Quarterly, Constantine Hriskos referred to this work as a call for "a more engaged, lived, and embodied scholarship that would 'resensualize us' (p.xviii) and others". Along with anthropologist, Michael Jackson, Stoller has questioned the hegemony of the senses (sensorium) in his cultural critiques. Catherine Aleen, Ruth Behar, Michael Taussig and others engage in blurring genres of writing that include interspersing critical analysis with personal reflection.

== Selected publications ==
- (1987) In Sorcery's Shadow: A Memoir of Apprenticeship Among The Songhay of Niger (co-authored with Cheryl Olkes). University of Chicago Press.
- (1989) The Taste of Ethnographic Things: The Senses in Anthropology. University of Pennsylvania Press.
- (1989) Fusion of the Worlds: Ethnography of Possession Among the Songhay of Niger. University of Chicago Press.
- (1992) The Cinematic Griot: The Ethnography of Jean Rouch. University of Chicago Press.
- (1995) Embodying Colonial Memories: Spirit Possession, Power, and the Hauka in West Africa. Routledge.
- (1997) Sensuous Scholarship. University of Pennsylvania Press.
- (1999) Jaguar: A Story of Africans in America. University of Chicago Press,
- (2002) Money Has No Smell: The Africanization of New York City. University of Chicago Press.
- (2004) Stranger in the Village of the Sick: A Memoir of Cancer, Sorcery and Healing. Beacon Press.
- (2005) Gallery Bundu: A Story of an African Past. University of Chicago Press.
- (2008) The Power of the Between: An Anthropological Odyssey. University of Chicago Press.
- (2014) Yaya's Story: The Quest for Well-Being in the World. University of Chicago Press.
- (2016) The Sorcerer's Burden: The Ethnographic Saga of a Global Family. Palgrave Macmillan.
- (2018) Adventures in Blogging: Public Anthropology and Popular Media. University of Toronto Press.
- (2023) Wisdom from the Edge: Writing Ethnography in Turbulent Times. Cornell University Press.
