= Urban climate =

Climatic conditions within a city

The climate in urban areas differs from that in neighboring rural areas, as a result of urban development. Urbanization greatly changes the form of the landscape, and also produces changes in an area's air. The study of urban climate is urban climatology.

In 1950 Åke Sundborg published one of the first theories on the climate of cities.

In the pursuit of a forthcoming shift in energy sources, the pivotal role of natural elements within urban settings cannot be overstated. This involves tapping into the possibilities presented by solar radiation, wind patterns, as well as the thermal capacities inherent in soil and water. Additionally, it encompasses leveraging the influence of weather patterns, seasonal variations, and the presence of green spaces.

== Climate change ==
As climate change becomes a pressing global issue, it is important that both global and local economies adapt and innovate in their methodologies to foster sustainable practices. It is critical for them to embrace renewable energy sources, eco-friendly production methods, and efficient resource management, to maintain economic growth while minimizing environmental impact. It's important for experts to communicate and amplify the awareness, while dispelling the misinformation. In regions like India, attaining sustainable urban development poses formidable challenges, due to a lack of climate awareness within the planning system. Sustained progress relies on a comprehensive understanding of the intricate interactions between urbanization and climate change, which necessitates incorporating climate considerations and resilience measures into the fabric of urban planning. By enhancing knowledge and raising awareness among planners, policymakers, and stakeholders, it becomes possible to integrate climate-responsive strategies into the planning process, including efficient land use, low-carbon transportation, renewable energy, and climate-resilient infrastructure. Addressing this knowledge gap and fostering a climate-conscious mindset within the planning system are critical steps towards achieving sustainable urban development in India and empowering cities to navigate the complex challenges of climate change while ensuring a harmonious and prosperous future for its residents.

== Communities ==
Contemporary urban planning should transcend mere aesthetics achieved through private initiatives, recognizing the significance of inclusive and accessible public spaces. These shared spaces play a vital role in safeguarding the fundamental right to adequate housing for all. It entails a social contract that fosters unity among diverse individuals by establishing a sense of belonging and shared values. By prioritizing the development of public spaces alongside private endeavors, city planning can foster community cohesion, promote equitable access to resources, and contribute to the overall well-being and quality of life for residents, reinforcing the principles of social unity and collective progress.

== Heat inequality ==
Heat inequality refers to an uneven distribution of heat-related risks; the changing urban climate increases heat disparities and disproportionate impacts on certain populations, particularly low-income and racialized communities, often intensified by the urban heat island effect. Studies have shown that communities in expansive cities such as Toronto, Ontario and Paris, France, are more exposed to heat-related risks. Access to cooling infrastructure, green space, and tree cover is often unevenly distributed. Research has suggested that small-scale changes in green infrastructure, such as cool pavement with higher surface albedo (from 0.2 to 0.4) and lower heat capacity (from 0.62 to 0.49 J/K), could reduce the ground surface temperature by a maximum of 7.9 °C at noon. There is a need for greater consideration of vulnerable populations and efforts to mitigate negative effects using meaningful and sustainable public investment in certain parts of cities. In Paris, research has shown that groups who suffered from poverty and marginalization felt the most severe impacts. During the 2003 Paris heat wave, groups most affected lived in the maid's quarters, or chambre de bonne, where rooms frequently violated housing codes and lacked ventilation. These disparities highlight the need for urban climate adaptation strategies to incorporate environmental justice and community engagement into decision-making.

== Role of remote sensing education ==
A considerable number of undergraduate minority students with STEM backgrounds have limited knowledge of remote sensing and its applications in geophysics. This inadequate exposure, awareness, understanding, and engagement hinder their exploration of innovative approaches to gather environmental knowledge. In order to enrich undergraduate education, adequately prepare future geoscientists, empower underserved communities, and tackle the shortage of geoscience professionals, it is crucial to employ unique teaching and learning methods. The Center for Remote Sensing and Earth System Sciences (ReSESS) at City Tech focuses on leveraging remote sensing to attract and engage students from underserved communities, with a specific emphasis on studying urban climate dynamics in their local neighborhoods. This approach has demonstrated success in raising awareness and deepening understanding of the geosciences, while motivating students to contribute their newly acquired knowledge to local environmental sustainability initiatives.

== Temperature ==
Increased urban land use and occupation alters the local thermal field resulting in the development of warmer regions known as urban heat islands (UHIs). An urban heat island is a phenomenon where these surface temperature deviations and air in the lowest levels of the atmosphere are concentrated in urban areas and those immediately downwind, and often are more pronounced at night than during the day, rather than surrounding suburban and especially rural areas. The solar energy absorbed and produced from solar radiation and anthropogenic activity is partitioned accordingly: warming the air above the surface via convection, evaporating moisture from the urban surface system, and storing heat in surface materials, such as buildings and roads. The solar energy is stored during the day and typically released during the night. Dark materials making up the buildings, impermeable soil and paved surfaces retain a majority of the solar energy. This allows for larger heat islands and increased thermal discomfort. Surface reflectivity in urban areas can impact ambient temperature. When the vegetative surface is dark and dry it can reach 52 °C (126 °F), whereas when the land is light and moist it reaches 18 °C (64 °F). Water evaporation usually helps to release energy from vegetative surfaces to cool the surface above. But most hotspot locations have little greenery which influences the formation of urban heat islands. Darker man-made surfaces have a lower albedo and heat capacity than natural surfaces allowing for increased photochemical reaction rates and absorption of visible radiation. This phenomenon can also be exacerbated when people release waste heat via heating and ventilating systems (e.g. air conditioners) and vehicular emissions. Expansion of these urban areas can lead to higher surface and air temperatures contributing to urban climate.

== Thermal loading ==
A significant global challenge that cities face today is the escalating urban heat island effect. This phenomenon refers to the elevated temperatures experienced in urban areas due to the cumulative impact of both natural and human-induced factors. Managing the thermal load becomes imperative to regulate and sustain optimal temperatures in these urban environments. Strategic planning and implementation of various heat mitigation strategies become essential to counteract the adverse effects of urban heat islands. This involves the careful consideration of factors such as urban design, green infrastructure, building materials, landscaping, and energy-efficient cooling systems. By adopting a multifaceted approach that integrates natural and technological solutions to add or remove heat as necessary, cities can create more resilient and comfortable living environments, ensuring the well-being and quality of life for their inhabitants while mitigating the impact of urban heat islands on public health, energy consumption, and overall urban sustainability.

== Precipitation ==
Because cities are warmer, the warmer air is apt to rise, and if the humidity is high it can cause convectional rainfall – short intense bursts of rain and thunderstorms.

Urban areas produce particles of dust (notably soot) and these act as hygroscopic nuclei which encourages rain production and otherwise affects convection via cloud microphysics.

Because of the warmer temperatures there is less snow in the city than surrounding areas.

== Winds ==
Wind speeds are often lower in cities than the countryside because the buildings act as barriers (wind breaks). On the other hand, tall buildings can act as wind tunnels in which winds are funneled between the structures. This effect can be exacerbated on longer streets with suitable buildings properly oriented to the wind direction. The gusty winds around buildings also lead to eddying.

== Humidity ==
Cities usually have a lower relative humidity, with relevance for moist heat stress within cities, than the surrounding air because cities are hotter, and rainwater in cities is unable to be absorbed into the ground to be released into the air by evaporation, and transpiration occurs much less since cities contain little vegetation relative to rural areas. Surface runoff is usually taken up directly into the subterranean sewage water system and thus vanishes from the surface immediately. Better understanding of urban temperature and water vapor contributions and/ or loss will reveal the reasons for lower relative humidity within cities, especially since relative humidity is dependent on temperature changes.

== See also ==
- Air pollution
- Urban studies
