= Teresa del Valle =

Spanish anthropologist (1937–2025)

Teresa del Valle Murga
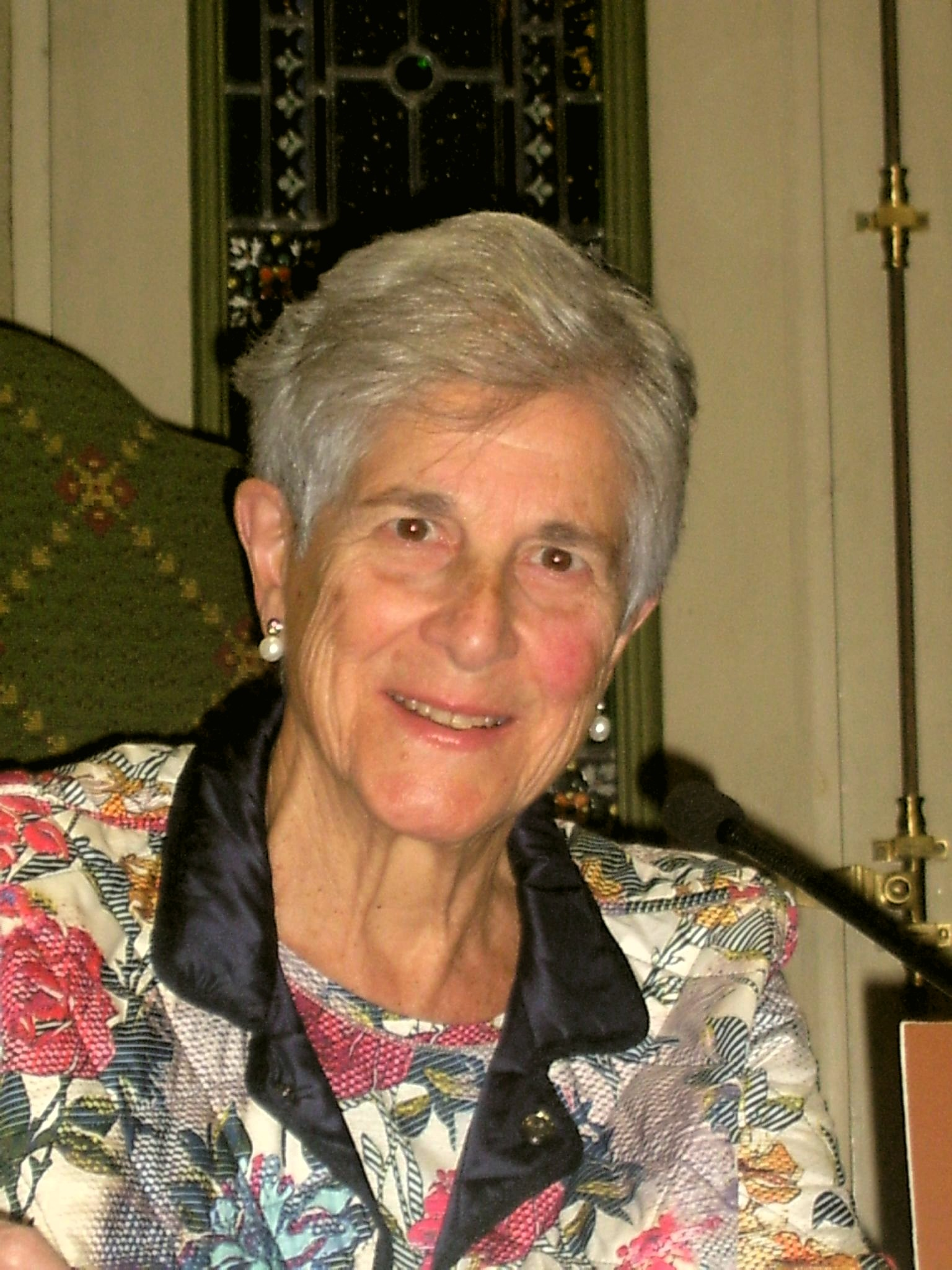
- Born: 1 April 1937; San Sebastián, Spain
- Died: 8 April 2025 (aged 88)

Teresa del Valle Murga (1 April 1937 – 8 April 2025) was a Spanish anthropologist, best known for her work in the fields of gender studies and feminism in Spain, in her publications Mujer vasca. Imagen y realidad (1985), Culturas oceánicas: Micronesia (1987), Género y sexualidad (1991), Gendered Anthropology (1993), and Perspectivas feministas desde la antropología social (2000). She was the recipient of a Emakunde Award for Equality in 2010. Del Valle died on 8 April 2025, at the age of 88.
