= Didier Fassin =

French anthropologist (born 1955)

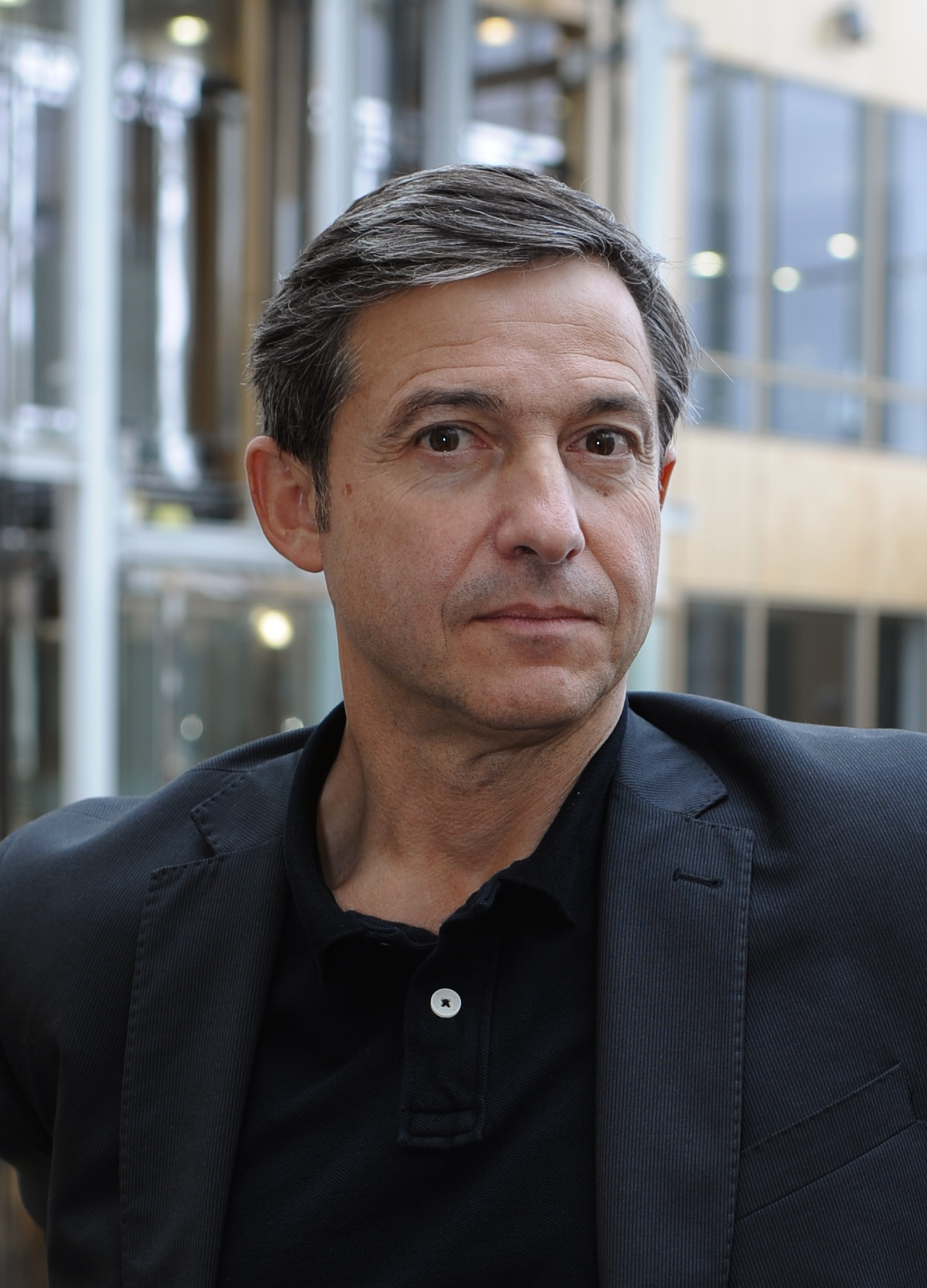
- French sociologist, anthropologist and physician
- Born: Didier Fassin; August 30, 1955 (age 70)
- Education: Pierre and Marie Curie University (MD) (present day Sorbonne University); École des hautes études en sciences sociales (PhD)
- Scientific career
- Fields: Sociology, anthropology, public health
- Institutions: Institute for Advanced Study; École des hautes études en sciences sociales Assistance Publique – Hôpitaux de Paris; Collège de France

Didier Fassin (born in 1955) is a French anthropologist and sociologist. He is a professor at the Collège de France on the chair “Moral Questions and Social Issues in Contemporary Societies” and the James D. Wolfensohn Professor of Social Science at the Institute for Advanced Study in Princeton and holds a Direction of Studies in Political and Moral Anthropology at the École des Hautes Études en Sciences Sociales in Paris. He was elected to the Academy of Europe in 2021 was elected to the American Philosophical Society in 2022.

== Career ==
Initially trained as a physician in Paris, Fassin practiced internal medicine as an infectious disease specialist at the Hospital Pitié-Salpétrière and taught public health at the Universite Pierre et Marie Curie (present day Sorbonne University). He was the physician of the Home for the Dying in Calcutta and the initiator of a national program of prevention of rheumatic heart disease in Tunisia where it was the first cause of death among young adults. Later shifting to the social sciences, he received his M.A. from the University of Paris, and his PhD from the École des Hautes Études en Sciences Sociales, writing his thesis on power relations and health inequalities in Senegal.

After having been granted a fellowship by the French Institute for Andean Studies to investigate maternal mortality and living conditions among Indian women in Ecuador, Fassin became professor of sociology in 1991 at the University of Paris North. There, he created Cresp, the Center for Research on Social and Health Issues, working on public health problems such as the history of child lead poisoning in France and the politics of Aids in Sub-Saharan Africa.

Elected in 1999 as director of studies in social anthropology at the École des Hautes Études en Sciences Sociales, Fassin founded and directed from 2007 to 2010 Iris, the Interdisciplinary Research Institute for Social Sciences, in an effort to bring together anthropologists, sociologists, historians, political scientists and legal scholars around contemporary political and social issues. He himself developed a long-term program exploring the multiple facets of humanitarianism in local and international policies, especially towards the poor, the immigrant and refugees, as well as victims of violence and epidemics. In parallel, he launched a research project on borders and boundaries in an attempt to articulate the issues around immigration and racialization, which were at the time dealt with in separate fields.

In 2008, Fassin received an Advanced Grant by the European Research Council for his program Towards a Critical Moral Anthropology. To reappraise theoretical issues in the analysis of morals and moralities, he started a research study on the police, justice and prison systems in France based, on an eighteen-month fieldwork with an anticrime unit and on four-year ethnography of a short-term corrections institution.

As part of this program, he developed in collaboration with Axel Honneth, an international program on crisis and critique, organized with Veena Das a scientific encounter around the words of crisis and gave the Page-Barbour Lectures on « Crisis : Elements of a Critique » at the University of Virginia. In parallel, he conducted with Anne-Claire Defossez an ethnography of the border between Italy and France in the Alps, on the basis of which they reconstituted the journeys and experiences of exiles from Africa and the Middle East, research for which they have been granted a writing residence at the French Academy in Rome. This research gave birth to the proposal of a moral anthropology of the state. In 2009, he succeeded Clifford Geertz at the Institute for Advanced Study, in Princeton, and became the first James D. Wolfensohn Professor of Social Science. His inaugural public lecture was entitled “Critique of Humanitarian Reason”. In 2010, he also became visiting professor at the Universities of Princeton and Hong Kong. In 2019 he was elected at the Collège de France on the Annual Chair in Public Health. His inaugurale lecture was on "The Inequality of Lives". His course was on “The Worlds of Public Health”. When he was elected to a permanent position at the chair “Moral Questions and Social Issues in Contemporary Societies”, in 2022, his second inaugural lecture was on “The Social Sciences in a Time of Crisis”. His first two twelve-lecture courses were on “The Trials of the Border” and “The Faculty to Punish”.

In 2016, he received the Gold Medal of the Swedish Society for Anthropology and Geography, which is awarded every three years to an anthropologist. That same year, he gave the Tanner Lectures on Human Values at the University of California, Berkeley, on “The Will to Punish”, and the Adorno Lectures at the Goethe University of Frankfurt on “A Critical Anthropology of Life”. In 2018, he delivered the Inaugural Raphael Lemkin Lecture at Rutgers University in honor of the Polish jurist who coined the term genocide, and in 2022, the Page-Barbour Lectures at the University of Virginia. He was the first social scientist to be given the Nomis Distinguished Scientist Award, which will support five years of research on crises. As part of this program, he developed a five-year research program with Anne-Claire Defossez on borders and exile. In 2024, he was awarded the Huxley Memorial Medal of the Royal Anthropological Institute of Great Britain and Ireland, being, after Marcel Mauss, Claude Lévi-Strauss, Louis Dumont, Pierre Bourdieu and Maurice Godelier, the sixth French social scientist to receive this prize.

== Activism ==
In the United States, as a member of the Committee of World Anthropology of the American Anthropological Association from 2010 to 2013, he was committed to the global exchange of knowledge and the reduction of the gap between the North and the South in the development of social science. This concern translated in 2015 in a three-year cycle Summer Program in Social Science for Latin American, Middle Eastern and African junior scholars. In connection with his work on prison and punishment, Fassin was invited in 2018 to join the New Jersey Criminal Sentencing and Disposition Commission, which has been appointed by the Governor of the State to make recommendations about the penal and corrections system, as Guest Advisor.

Apart from his academic career, Fassin has been involved in various solidarity non-governmental organizations in France. In 1996 he founded the Medico-social Unit Villermé at the Hospital Avicenne to provide health care to uninsured and undocumented patients. He was administrator and later vice-president of MSF, Doctors Without Borders, from 1999 to 2003, and is currently President of Comede, the Health Committee for the Exiles since 2006. A public intellectual, he frequently intervenes in the media on issues related to his research such as immigration, asylum, discrimination, social justice, law and order policies. He regards the social sciences as a form of “presence to the world” and has developed a program on the public life of ethnography.

== Major publications ==
=== As author ===
- Pouvoir et Maladie en Afrique. Anthropologie Sociale de la Banlieue de Dakar, Paris: Presses Universitaires de France, 1992.
- L'Espace Politique de la Santé. Essai de Généalogie, Paris: Presses Universitaires de France, 1996.
- Les Enjeux Politiques de la Santé. Etudes Sénégalaises, Équatoriennes et Françaises, Paris: Karthala, 2000.
- When Bodies Remember. Experience and Politics of AIDS in South Africa, Berkeley: University of California Press, 2007 (French version La Découverte 2006).
- The Empire of Trauma. An Inquiry into the Condition of Victimhood, with Richard Rechtman, Princeton: Princeton University Press, 2009 (French version L’Empire du Traumatisme, Flammarion, 2007).
- Humanitarian Reason. A Moral History of the Present, Berkeley: University of California Press, 2011 (French version La Raison Humanitaire, Hautes Etudes-Gallimard-Seuil, 2010).
- Enforcing Order. An Anthropology of Urban Policing, Cambridge: Polity Press, 2013 (French version La Force de l’Ordre. Une Anthropologie de la Police des Quartiers, Paris: Seuil, 2011).
- At the Heart of the State. The Moral World of Institutions, with Yasmine Bouagga et al. (French version Juger, Réprimer, Accompagner. Essai sur la morale de l’État, Paris: Seuil, 2011).
- Four Lectures on Ethics. Anthropological Perspectives, with Michael Lambek, Veena Das and Webb Keane, Chicago: Hau Books.
- Prison Worlds. An Anthropology of the Carceral Condition, Cambridge: Polity Press, 2016 (French version L’Ombre du monde. Une anthropologie de la condition carcérale, Paris: Seuil, 2011).
- The Will to Punish, ed. by Christopher Kutz, Oxford: Oxford University Press, 2018 (French Version Punir. Une passion contemporaine, Paris: Seuil, 2017).
- Le monde à l’épreuve de l’asile. Essai d’anthropologie critique, Charenton-le-Pont: Presses de la Société d’ethnologie, 2017.
- Life. A Critical User's Manual, Cambridge, UK; Medford, MA: Polity Press, 2018 (French version la vie. mode d'emploi critique, Paris: Seuil, 2018).
- On the Inequality of Lives. Inaugural Lecture at the Collège de France, OpenEdition Books, 2023 (French version : De l’inégalité des vies. Leçon inaugurale au Collège de France, Paris : Fayard, 2020)
- Policing the City. An Ethno-Graphic (translation Rachel Gomme), New York, Other Press, 100 p., 2022. (with Frédéric Debomy and Jake Raynal), New York: Other Press, 2021 (French version: La Force de l’ordre. Enquête ethno-graphique, Paris: Delcourt-Seuil, 2020)
- Sciences sociales par temps de crise. Leçon inaugurale au Collège de France, Paris : Collège de France, 2023.
- Death of a Traveller. A Counter Investigation (translation Rachel Gomme), Cambridge, Polity, 130 p., 2021. (French version : Mort d'un voyageur. Une contre-enquête, Paris: Seuil, 2020).
- La Recherche à l’épreuve du politique. Tribulations ethnographiques, Paris, Textuel, 77 p., 2023.
- The Worlds of Public Health. Anthropological Excursions. Course at the Collège de France 2021 (translation Rachel Gomme), Cambridge, Polity, 260 p., 2023.
- Moral Abdication. How the World Failed to Stop the Destruction of Gaza (translation Gregory Elliott), Verso, 2024 (French version: Une étrange défaite. Sur le consentement à l’écrasement de Gaza, La Découverte, 2024).
- Exile: Chronicle of the Border (with Anne-Claire Defossez), Polity, 2025 (French Version: L’Exil, toujours recommencé. Chronique de la frontière (with Anne-Claire Defossez), Paris : Seuil, 2024).
- Leçons de ténèbres. Ce que la violence dit du monde, La Découverte, 2025.

=== As editor ===
- Sociétés, Développement et Santé (with Yannick Jaffré), Paris: Ellipses, 1990.
- Mujeres de los Andes. Condiciones de Vida y Salud (with Anne-Claire Defossez et Mara Viveros), Bogotá: Universidad Externado de Colombia-IFEA, 1992.
- Les Lois de l'Inhospitalité. Les Politiques de l’Immigration à l'Épreuve des Sans-papiers (with Alain Morice et Catherine Quiminal), Paris: La Découverte, 1997.
- Les Figures Urbaines de la Santé Publique. Enquête sur des Expériences Locales, Paris: La Découverte, 1998.
- Les Inégalités Sociales de Santé (with Annette Leclerc, Hélène Grandjean, Thierry Lang et Monique Kaminski), Paris: Inserm-La Découverte, 2000.
- Critique de la Santé Publique. Une Approche Anthropologique (avec Jean-Pierre Dozon), Paris: Balland, 2001.
- Le Gouvernement des Corps (with Dominique Memmi), Paris: Editions de l’Ecole des Hautes Études en Sciences Sociales, 2004.
- Les Constructions de l’Intolérable. Etudes d’Anthropologie et d’Histoire sur les Frontières de l’Espace Moral (with Patrice Bourdelais), Paris: La Découverte, 2005.
- De la Question Sociale à la Question Raciale? Représenter la Société Française (with Eric Fassin), Paris: La Découverte, 2006, 2nd edition 2010.
- Les Politiques de l’Enquête. Epreuves Ethnographiques (with Alban Bensa), Paris: La Découverte, 2008.
- Contemporary States of Emergency. The Politics of Military and Humanitarian Interventions (with Mariella Pandolfi), New York: Zone Books, 2010.
- L’Etat des Savoirs de la Santé Publique (with Boris Hauray), Paris: La Découverte, 2010.
- Les Nouvelles Frontières de la Société Française, Paris: La Découverte, 2010., 2nd édition 2012.
- Économies morales Contemporaines (with Jean-Sébastien Eideliman), Paris: La Découverte, 2012.
- Moral Anthropology. A Companion, Malden: Wiley-Blackwell, 2012.
- Moral Anthropology; A Critical Reader, with Samuel Lézé, London: Routledge, 2014.
- If Truth Be Told. The Politics of Public Ethnography, Durham: Duke University Press, 2017.
- Writing the World of Policing. The Difference Ethnography Makes, Chicago: The University of Chicago Press, 2017.
- A Time for Critique, with Bernard E. Harcourt, New York: Columbia University Press, 2019.
- Deepening Divides. How Territorial Borders and Social Boundaries Delineate our World, London: Pluto Press, 2020.
- Rebel Economies. Warlords, Insurgents, Humanitarians (with Nicola Di Cosmo and Clémence Pinaud), Lanham, Rowman & Littlefield, 290 p., 2021.
- Words and Worlds. A Lexicon for Dark Times (avec Veena Das), Durham, Duke University Press, 319 p., 2021.
- Pandemic Exposures. Economy and Society in the Time of Coronavirus (avec Marion Fourcade), Chicago, Hau Books, 476 p., 2021.
- La Société qui vient, Paris, Seuil, 1335 p., 2022
- Crisis Under Critique. How People Assess, Transform and Respond to Critical Situations (with Axel Honneth), New York: Columbia University Press, 456p., 2022.
- Vies invisibles, morts indicibles, Paris : Collège de France, 2022.
- The Social Sciences in the Looking-Glass. Studies in the Production of Knowledge (with George Steinmetz), Durham: Duke University Press, 409 p., 2023.
