= Miguel Vale de Almeida =

Portuguese anthropologist and LGBT activist (born 1960)

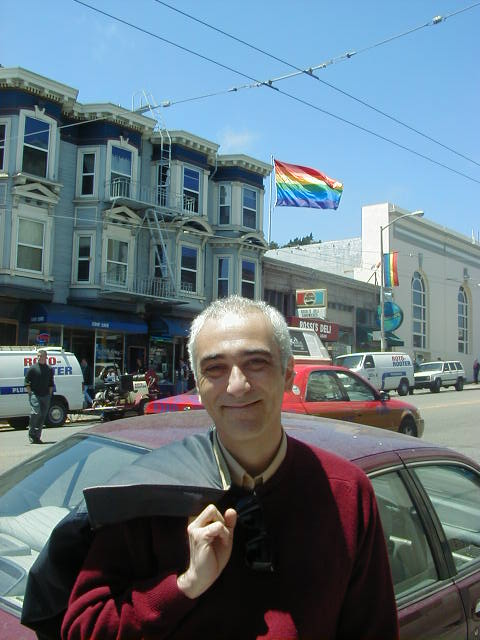
- Born: August 21, 1960 (age 65); Lisbon, Portugal
- Occupations: Anthropologist and professor
- Known for: LGBTQ activist
- Website: http://miguelvaledealmeida.net/

Miguel Vale de Almeida (born August 21, 1960) is a Portuguese anthropologist, LGBTQ activist, and professor at the Instituto Superior de Ciências do Trabalho e da Empresa (ISCTE) in Lisbon. He is the current editor-in-chief of the journal Etnográfica and member of CEAS-ISCTE and APA. He was Visiting Professor (Tinker Fellowship) Dept of Anthropology and Latin American Studies’ Center, University of Chicago in the spring of 2006. As an LGBT activist, he is known in Portugal for participating in LGBT rights events, including several appearances on LGBT debates in television.

== Research interests ==
- Gender, Sexuality, Body
- Race, Ethnicity, Ethnopolitics
- Post-colonial studies, Creoleness
- Portugal, Brazil, Afro-Diaspora

== Books ==
- A Chave do Armário. Homossexualidade, Casamento, Família (Lisboa. ICS, 2009).
- Um Mar da Cor da Terra. Raça, Cultura e Política da Identidade, Oeiras: Celta. (2000)
  - English version: An Earth-Colored Sea. Race, Culture and the Politics of Identity in the Post-Colonial Portuguese-Speaking World, Oxford and New York: Berghahn Books. (2004)
- Senhores de Si: Uma Interpretação Antropológica da Masculinidade, Lisboa: Fim de Século, colecção “Antropológica”. (first edition: 1995).
  - English version: The Hegemonic Male: Masculinity in a Portuguese Town, Oxford and Providence: Berghahn Books. (2004)
- Outros Destinos. Ensaios de Antropologia e Cidadania - Porto: Campo das Letras. (2004)
- Corpo Presente: Treze Reflexões Antropológicas sobre o Corpo (org.) - Oeiras: Celta. (1996)

== Degrees ==
- 2000, ISCTE / Tenure.
- 1994, PhD Social Anthropology, ISCTE.
- 1986, Master’s Degree in Anthropology, State University of New York, Binghamton, E.U.A.
- 1983, Licenciatura in Anthropology, FCSH - Universidade Nova de Lisboa.
