= Valter Axelsson =

Swedish geomorphologist and educator

- Born: 30 May 1924; Sweden
- Education: Uppsala University
- Known for: Deltaic processes
- Scientific career
- Fields: Geomorphology; Sedimentology
- Doctoral advisor: Filip Hjulström

Axel Gunnar Valter Axelsson (born 30 May 1924) was a Swedish geomorphologist and educator who made significant contributions to the understanding of the delta sedimentology and dynamics. One of his principal study sites was the Laitaure delta in Sarek National Park. In his thesis work on Laitaure delta and Rapaälven Axelsson drew on a hydrological data collection started by Axel Hamberg.
