= Anders Rapp =

Swedish geomorphologist and geographer

- Born: 1927
- Died: 1998 (aged 70–71)
- Education: Uppsala University
- Known for: Process geomorphology
- Awards: Kirk Bryan Award (1962); Björkénska priset (1979)
- Scientific career
- Fields: Geomorphology
- Workplaces: Lund University
- Doctoral advisor: Filip Hjulström

Anders Rapp (1927–1998) was a Swedish geomorphologist and geographer who pioneered quantitative geomorphological approach on mass movements and erosion. He was the first to make a comprehensive study on avalanche boulder tongues. Most of Rapp's works were made in the Scandinavian Mountains and Spitsbergen including the areas of Kärkevagge near Abisko and Kebnekaise.

Studying under Filip Hjulström, Rapp got his Ph.D. at Uppsala University in 1961, and was appointed professor of physical geography at Lund University in 1977. In 1980, he was elected a member of the Royal Swedish Academy of Sciences.

== Research contributions ==
Building on the process-geomorphology tradition of his supervisor Hjulström, Rapp introduced systematic sediment-budget techniques to cold-region landscapes. His 1961 thesis on the Kärkevagge valley quantified every pathway by which rock is liberated from frost-shattered cliffs, transported downslope by avalanches and debris flows, and ultimately stored in valley-floor talus—demonstrating that avalanche boulder tongues can move blocks more than 70 tonnes at mean rates of 0.5 metres per year. The work became a benchmark for coupling climate, slope process and landform evolution, and earned him the Kirk Bryan Award of the Geological Society of America in 1962.

From 1966 to 1976 he led Sweden's contribution to the International Hydrological Decade high-mountain programme. Instrument arrays on Kebnekaise recorded that suspended-sediment yields during summer snowmelt were an order of magnitude higher after snow-avalanche winters than after wind-blown winters, demonstrating the role of winter climate in controlling annual denudation budgets. Parallel expeditions to central Spitsbergen mapped sorted-circle fields and dated debris-flow lobes, providing the first process rates for high-Arctic periglacial slopes.
