= ISCTE – University Institute of Lisbon =

Public university in Lisbon, Portugal

ISCTE IUL – University Institute of Lisbon
- ISCTE – Instituto Universitário de Lisboa
- Former name: ISCTE – Instituto Superior de Ciências do Trabalho e da Empresa
- Established: 1972
- Rector: Maria de Lurdes Rodrigues
- Faculty: 780
- Administrative staff: 270
- Students: 11,000
- Location: Lisbon, Portugal
- Campus: Cidade Universitária de Lisboa
- Website: iscte-iul.pt
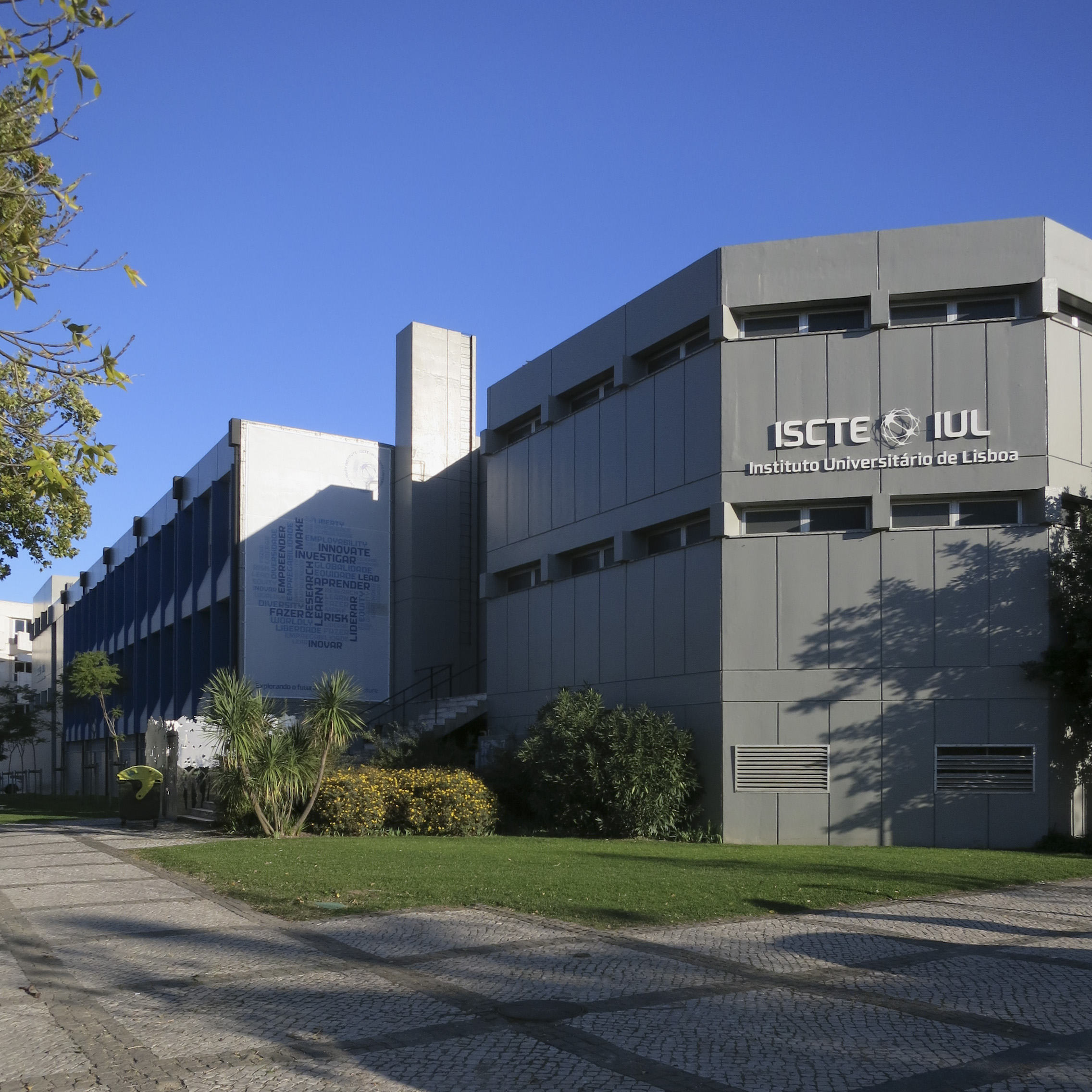

General information
- Coordinates: 38°44′56″N 9°9′14″W

ISCTE – IUL (Instituto Universitário de Lisboa) is a Portuguese public tertiary education institution. It is located in the city centre of Lisbon, in Cidade Universitária, adjoining the Institute of Social Sciences (ICS) and Institute of Geography and Spatial Planning (IGOT) of the University of Lisbon. ISCTE was founded in 1972, starting with three degrees and 296 students. Formerly called Instituto Superior de Ciências do Trabalho e da Empresa (in English, Higher Institute of Business and Labour Sciences), its full name was dropped in 2009 when it became a university institute of foundational nature.

In 2019 Iscte adopted a new visual identity for its brand, with a new logo and graphic norms, and a change of name to Iscte – Instituto Universitário de Lisboa, or simply Iscte (written like this, not like an acronym). In 2022, the year that it celebrated 50 years, Iscte inaugurated a new centre in Sintra, which started with eight degrees.

As of today, Iscte is widely considered a fully-fledged public research university despite its traditional designation, as reflected in national news coverage of the performance of Portuguese universities internationally and open, external assessments by international organisations. ISCTE Business School holds institutional accreditations from the Association to Advance Collegiate Schools of Business (AACSB) and Association of MBAs (AMBA).

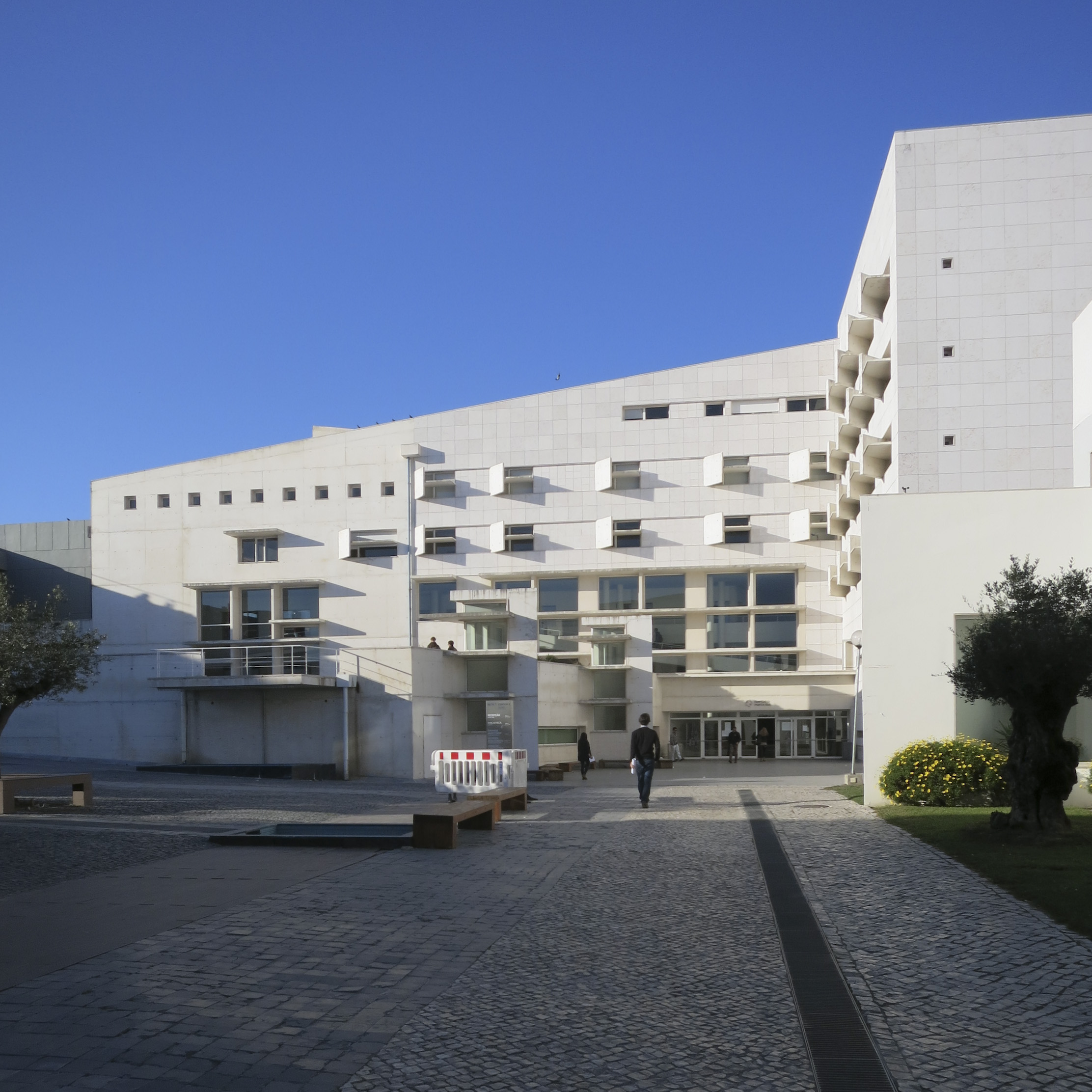
Image of ISCTE

== Schools ==
ISCTE is made up of four schools:

- ISCTE Business School (IBS)
- School of Social and Human Sciences (ECSH)
- School of Sociology and Public Policy (ESPP)
- School of Technology and Architecture (ISTA)

ISCTE also has an institute dedicated to executive education, namely INDEG-ISCTE Executive Education.

== Degree programmes ==
ISCTE confers bachelor's, master's, integrated master's and PhD degrees and habilitation in scientific areas such as anthropology, sociology, African studies, history, social psychology, political science, planning, architecture, economics, finance, business administration and management, human resources, marketing, computer science, telecommunications engineering, or industrial engineering.

== History ==
ISCTE was established in Lisbon in 1972 as Instituto Superior de Ciências do Trabalho e da Empresa using the faculty and facilities of the Instituto de Estudos Sociais (Institute of Social Studies, founded in 1963) as a first step towards a new and innovative public university in Lisbon. Its present designation dates from 2009.

In 1972, the first year of operation, 296 students matriculated at ISCTE: 219 in Economics, 66 in Business Administration (in Portuguese: Organização e Gestão de Empresas) and 11 in Work Sciences (Ciências do Trabalho).

From its creation, ISCTE was authorised to grant the bachelor's degree and the licenciatura degree, which was granted after the completion of four to five years of study that often required writing a final dissertation and thus was roughly equivalent to the current master's degree, instituted as part of the Bologna process. From 1983 onwards, ISCTE was also authorised to grant the master's degree, which was higher than the current Bologna process master's degree but still lower than a doctorate degree.

What was to be the first college of a never completed larger projected university (due to the Carnation Revolution of 1974) always remained a non-integrated university college/institute. This situation was regularised in 1988, and from that date onwards, ISCTE grants all academic degrees, including bachelor's, master's and PhD degrees, honorary doctorate and habilitation (called Agregação in Portuguese). In 2000, a university organisational framework design for ISCTE was published.

ISCTE is today part of both the Fundação das Universidades Portuguesas (Foundation of Portuguese Universities) and the Conselho de Reitores das Universidades Portuguesas (Council of Rectors of Portuguese Universities). It is also one of the few public university education institutions in Portugal with a foundational nature, other examples being the University of Porto, University of Aveiro and New University of Lisbon.

It is known that, in 2002, the Council of Rectors of Portuguese Universities emitted the opinion that ISCTE should integrate the University of Lisbon (1911–2013), and in 2012, the University of Lisbon (before the merger with the Technical University of Lisbon) invited ISCTE to become a part of the bigger University, but ISCTE turned down both invitations.

== Research units ==
ISCTE has quality research centers in all its domains. The major research centers are:

- BRU-IUL – Business Research Unit
- CEI-IUL – Centro de Estudos Internacionais
- CIES-IUL – Centro de Investigação e Estudos de Sociologia
- CIS-IUL – Centro de Investigação e Intervenção Social
- CRIA-IUL – Centro em Rede de Investigação em Antropologia
- DINÂMIA'CET-IUL – Centro de Estudos sobre a Mudança Socioeconómica e o Território
- IT-IUL – Instituto de Telecomunicações
- ISTAR-IUL – Centro de Investigação em Ciências da Informação, Tecnologias e Arquitetura

== Notable alumni and professors ==
- Gustavo Cardoso – Sociologist and World Economic Forum's Young Global Leader in 2008 (Professor)
- João de Pina-Cabral – Anthropologist (former professor)
- João Mário Grilo – Film director (former Sociology student)
- Manuel Carvalho da Silva – Leader of the General Confederation of the Portuguese Workers (former graduate student in sociology)
- Maria de Lurdes Rodrigues – Former Minister for Education (Professor and former student)
- Miguel Vale de Almeida – Anthropologist, LGBT activist and former deputy to the Assembly of the Republic (Professor)

== See also ==
- List of universities in Portugal
- Higher education in Portugal
