= Geomorphology =

Scientific study of landforms

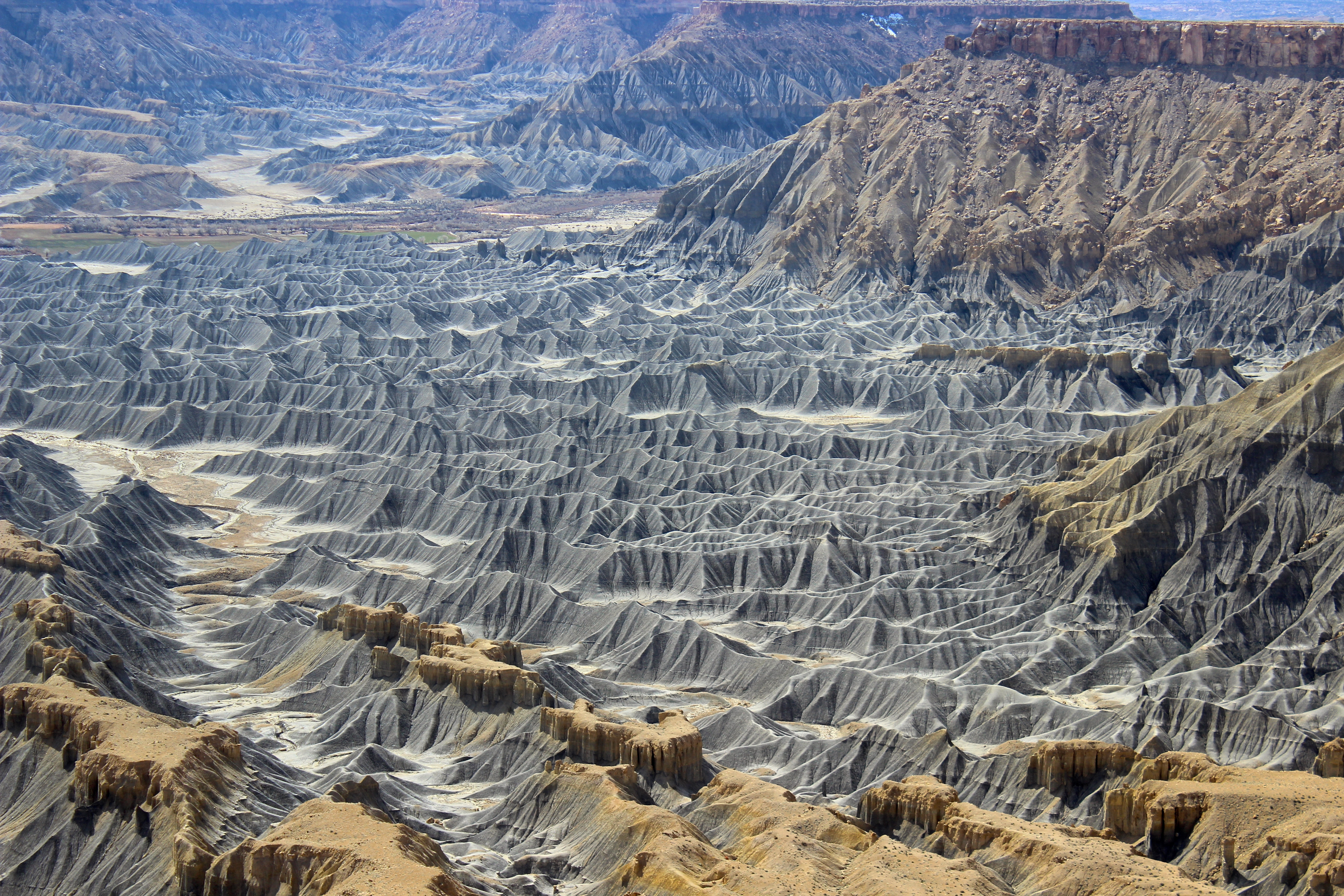
Badlands incised into shale at the foot of the North Caineville Plateau, Utah, within the pass carved by the Fremont River and known as the Blue Gate. G. K. Gilbert studied the landscapes of this area in great detail, forming the observational foundation for many of his studies on geomorphology.

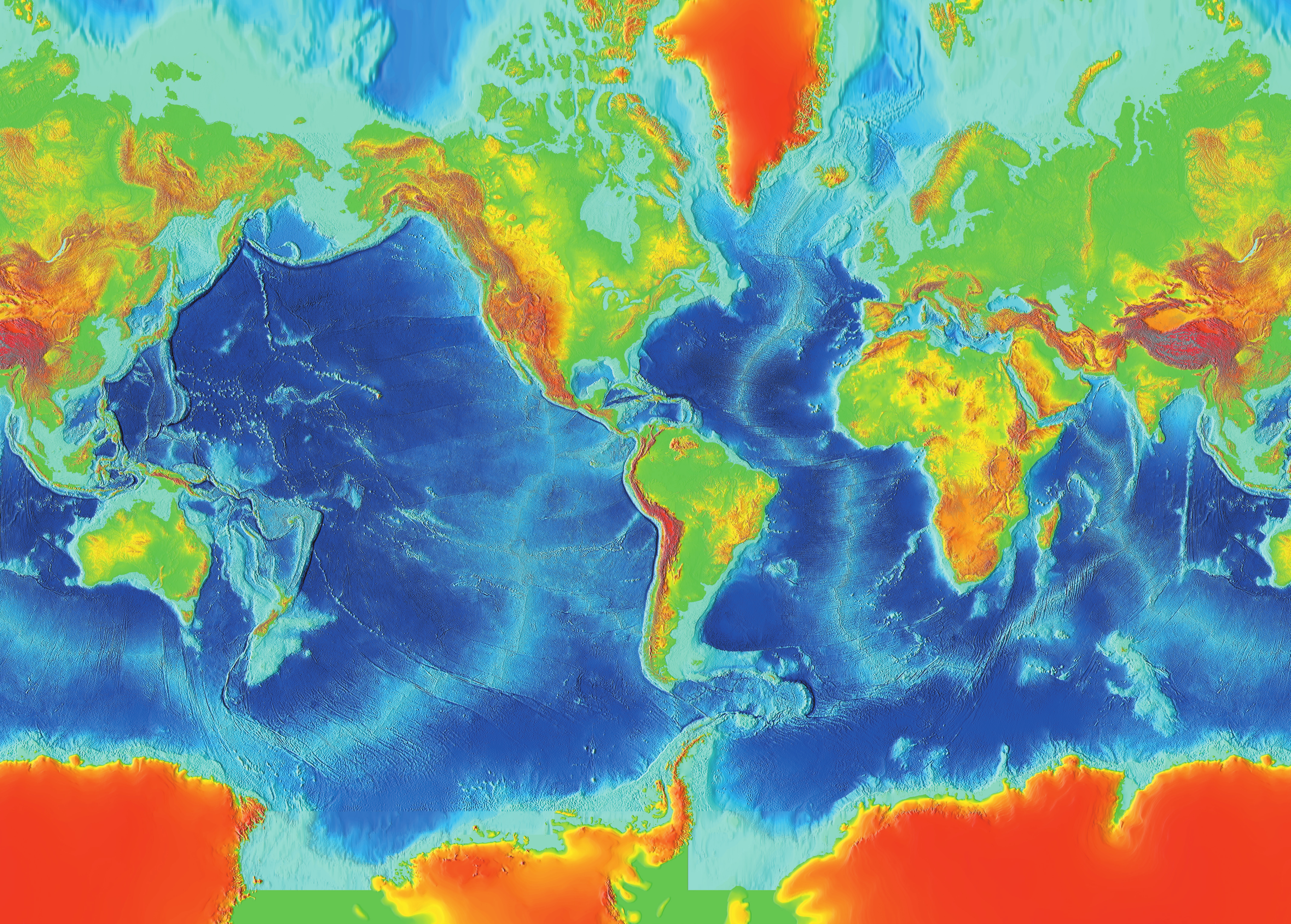
Surface of Earth, showing higher elevations in red

Geomorphology (from Ancient Greek γῆ (gê) 'earth', μορφή (morphḗ) 'form' and λόγος (lógos) 'study') is the scientific study of the origin and evolution of topographic and bathymetric features generated by physical, chemical or biological processes operating at or near Earth's surface. Geomorphologists seek to understand why landscapes look the way they do, to understand landform and terrain history and dynamics and to predict changes through a combination of field observations, physical experiments and numerical modeling. Geomorphologists work within disciplines such as physical geography, geology, geodesy, engineering geology, archaeology, climatology, and geotechnical engineering. This broad base of interests contributes to many research styles and interests within the field.

== Overview ==
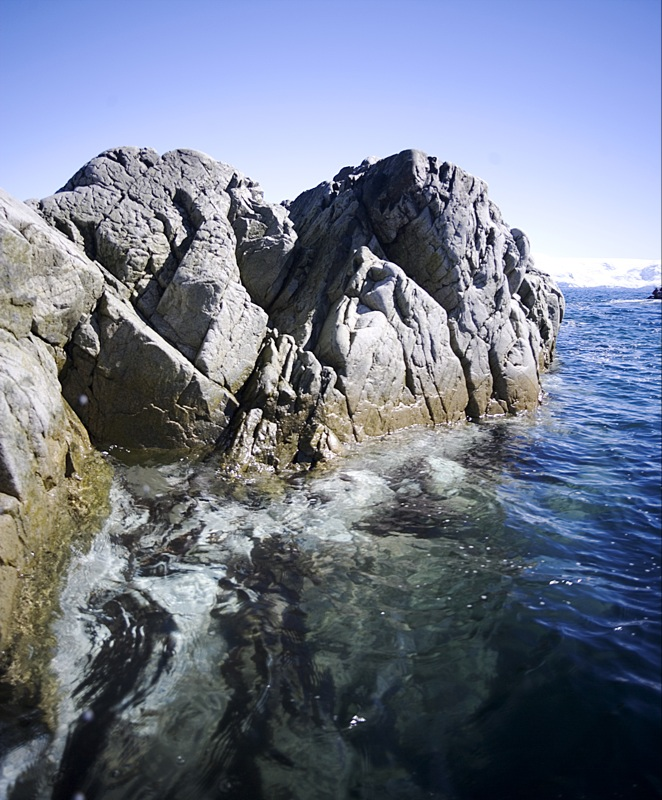
Waves and water chemistry lead to structural failure in exposed rocks.

Earth's surface is modified by a combination of surface processes that shape landscapes, and geologic processes that cause tectonic uplift and subsidence, and shape the coastal geography. Surface processes comprise the action of water, wind, ice, wildfire, and life on the surface of the Earth, along with chemical reactions that form soils and alter material properties, the stability and rate of change of topography under the force of gravity, and other factors, such as (in the very recent past) human alteration of the landscape. Many of these factors are strongly mediated by climate. Geologic processes include the uplift of mountain ranges, the growth of volcanoes, isostatic changes in land surface elevation (sometimes in response to surface processes), and the formation of deep sedimentary basins where the surface of the Earth drops and is filled with material eroded from other parts of the landscape. The Earth's surface and its topography therefore are an intersection of climatic, hydrologic, and biologic action with geologic processes, or alternatively stated, the intersection of the Earth's lithosphere with its hydrosphere, atmosphere, and biosphere.

The broad-scale topographies of the Earth illustrate this intersection of surface and subsurface action. Mountain belts are uplifted due to geologic processes. Denudation of these high uplifted regions produces sediment that is transported and deposited elsewhere within the landscape or off the coast. On progressively smaller scales, similar ideas apply, where individual landforms evolve in response to the balance of additive processes (uplift and deposition) and subtractive processes (subsidence and erosion). Often, these processes directly affect each other: ice sheets, water, and sediment are all loads that change topography through flexural isostasy. Topography can modify the local climate, for example through orographic precipitation, which in turn modifies the topography by changing the hydrologic regime in which it evolves. Many geomorphologists are particularly interested in the potential for feedbacks between climate and tectonics, mediated by geomorphic processes.

In addition to these broad-scale questions, geomorphologists address issues that are more specific or more local. Glacial geomorphologists investigate glacial deposits such as moraines, eskers, and proglacial lakes, as well as glacial erosional features, to build chronologies of both small glaciers and large ice sheets and understand their motions and effects upon the landscape. Fluvial geomorphologists focus on rivers, how they transport sediment, migrate across the landscape, cut into bedrock, respond to environmental and tectonic changes, and interact with humans. Soil geomorphologists investigate soil profiles and chemistry to learn about the history of a particular landscape and understand how climate, biota, and rock interact. Other geomorphologists study how hillslopes form and change. Still others investigate the relationships between ecology and geomorphology. Because geomorphology is defined to comprise everything related to the surface of the Earth and its modification, it is a broad field with many facets.

Geomorphologists use a wide range of techniques in their work. These may include fieldwork and field data collection, the interpretation of remotely sensed data, geochemical analyses, and the numerical modelling of the physics of landscapes. Geomorphologists may rely on geochronology, using dating methods to measure the rate of changes to the surface. Terrain measurement techniques are vital to quantitatively describe the form of the Earth's surface, and include differential GPS, remotely sensed digital terrain models and laser scanning, to quantify, study, and to generate illustrations and maps.

Practical applications of geomorphology include hazard assessment (such as landslide prediction and mitigation), river control and stream restoration, and coastal protection.

Planetary geomorphology studies landforms on other terrestrial planets such as Mars. Indications of effects of wind, fluvial, glacial, mass wasting, meteor impact, tectonics and volcanic processes are studied. This effort not only helps better understand the geologic and atmospheric history of those planets but also extends geomorphological study of the Earth. Planetary geomorphologists often use Earth analogues to aid in their study of surfaces of other planets.

== History ==
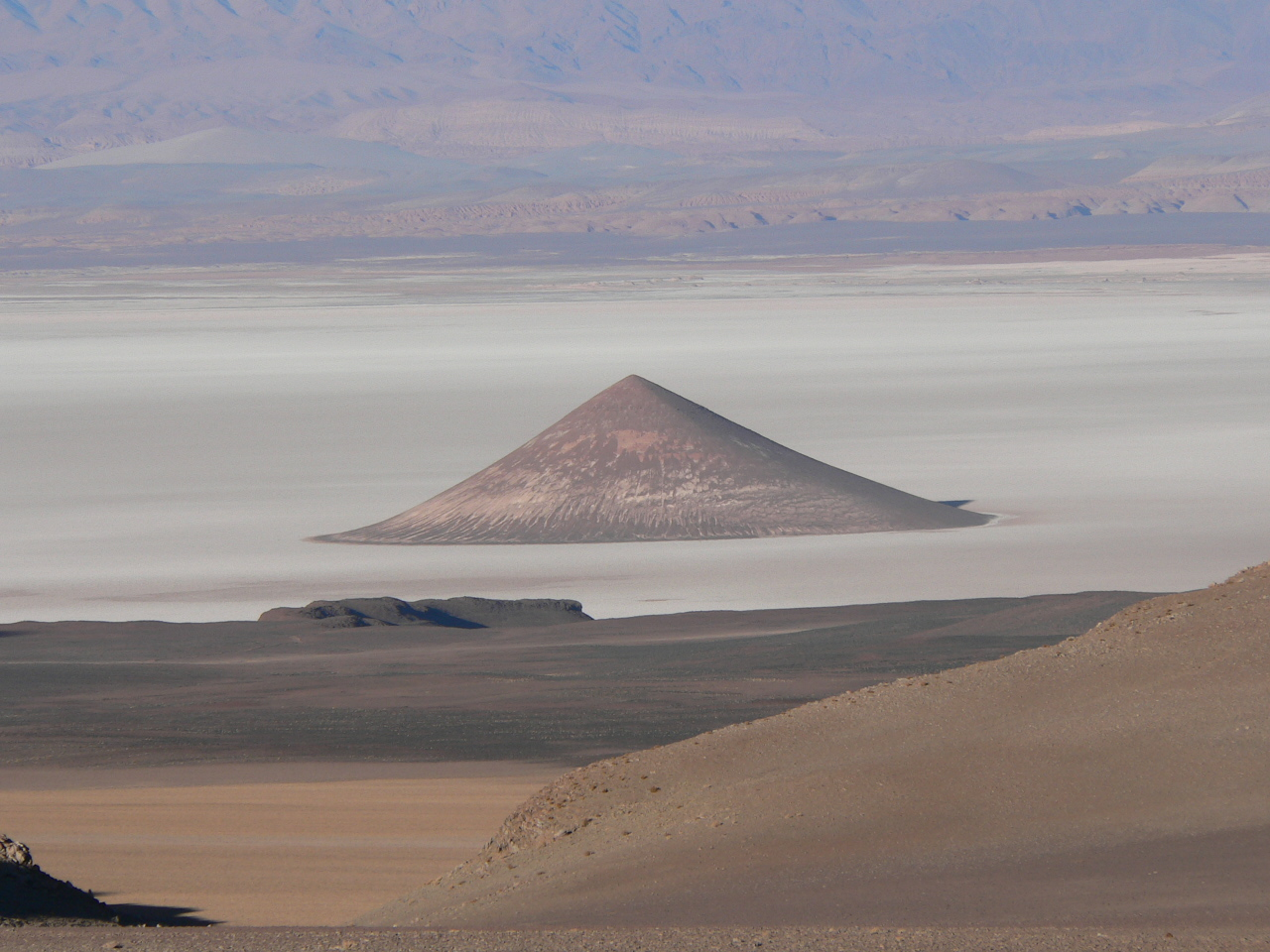
"Cono de Arita" at the dry lake Salar de Arizaro on the Atacama Plateau, in northwestern Argentina. The cone itself is a volcanic edifice, representing complex interaction of intrusive igneous rocks with the surrounding salt.

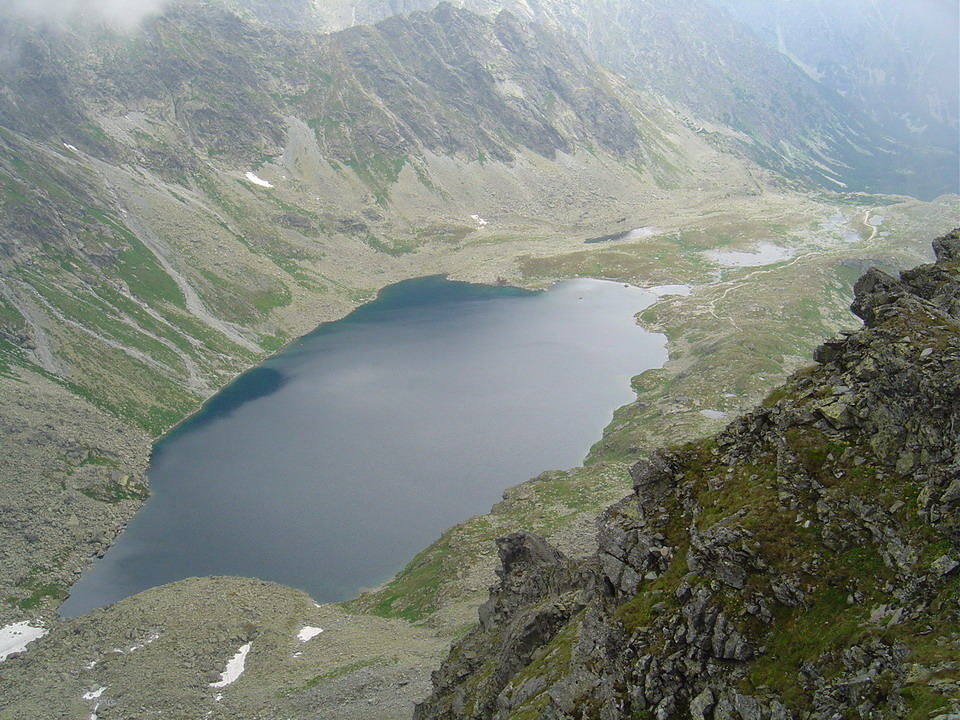
Lake "Veľké Hincovo pleso" in High Tatras, Slovakia. The lake occupies an "overdeepening" carved by flowing ice that once occupied this glacial valley.

Other than some notable exceptions in antiquity, geomorphology is a relatively young science, growing along with interest in other aspects of the Earth sciences in the mid-19th century. This section provides a very brief outline of some of the major figures and events in its development.

=== Ancient geomorphology ===
The study of landforms and the evolution of the Earth's surface can be dated back to scholars of Classical Greece. In the 5th century BC, Greek historian Herodotus argued from observations of soils that the Nile Delta was actively growing into the Mediterranean Sea, and estimated its age. In the 4th century BC, Greek philosopher Aristotle speculated that due to sediment transport into the sea, eventually those seas would fill while the land lowered. He claimed that this would mean that land and water would eventually swap places, whereupon the process would begin again in an endless cycle. The Encyclopedia of the Brethren of Purity published in Arabic at Basra during the 10th century also discussed the cyclical changing positions of land and sea with rocks breaking down and being washed into the sea, their sediment eventually rising to form new continents. The medieval Persian Muslim scholar Abū Rayhān al-Bīrūnī (973–1048), after observing rock formations at the mouths of rivers, hypothesized that the Indian Ocean once covered all of India. In his De Natura Fossilium of 1546, German metallurgist and mineralogist Georgius Agricola (1494–1555) wrote about erosion and natural weathering.

Another early theory of geomorphology was devised by Song dynasty Chinese scientist and statesman Shen Kuo (1031–1095). This was based on his observation of marine fossil shells in a geological stratum of a mountain hundreds of miles from the Pacific Ocean. Noticing bivalve shells running in a horizontal span along the cut section of a cliffside, he theorized that the cliff was once the pre-historic location of a seashore that had shifted hundreds of miles over the centuries. He inferred that the land was reshaped and formed by soil erosion of the mountains and by deposition of silt, after observing strange natural erosions of the Taihang Mountains and the Yandang Mountain near Wenzhou. Furthermore, he promoted the theory of gradual climate change over centuries of time once ancient petrified bamboos were found to be preserved underground in the dry, northern climate zone of Yanzhou, which is now modern day Yan'an, Shaanxi province. Previous Chinese authors also presented ideas about changing landforms. Scholar-official Du Yu (222–285) of the Western Jin dynasty predicted that two monumental stelae recording his achievements, one buried at the foot of a mountain and the other erected at the top, would eventually change their relative positions over time as would hills and valleys. Daoist alchemist Ge Hong (284–364) created a fictional dialogue where the immortal Magu explained that the territory of the East China Sea was once a land filled with mulberry trees.

=== Early modern geomorphology ===
The term geomorphology seems to have been first used by Laumann in an 1858 work written in German. Keith Tinkler has suggested that the word came into general use in English, German and French after John Wesley Powell and W. J. McGee used it during the International Geological Conference of 1891. John Edward Marr in his The Scientific Study of Scenery considered his book as, 'an Introductory Treatise on Geomorphology, a subject which has sprung from the union of Geology and Geography'.

An early popular geomorphic model was the geographical cycle or cycle of erosion model of broad-scale landscape evolution developed by William Morris Davis between 1884 and 1899. It was an elaboration of the uniformitarianism theory that had first been proposed by James Hutton (1726–1797). With regard to valley forms, for example, uniformitarianism posited a sequence in which a river runs through a flat terrain, gradually carving an increasingly deep valley, until the side valleys eventually erode, flattening the terrain again, though at a lower elevation. It was thought that tectonic uplift could then start the cycle over. In the decades following Davis's development of this idea, many of those studying geomorphology sought to fit their findings into this framework, known today as "Davisian". Davis's ideas are of historical importance, but have been largely superseded today, mainly due to their lack of predictive power and qualitative nature.

In the 1920s, Walther Penck developed an alternative model to Davis's. Penck thought that landform evolution was better described as an alternation between ongoing processes of uplift and denudation, as opposed to Davis's model of a single uplift followed by decay. He also emphasised that in many landscapes slope evolution occurs by backwearing of rocks, not by Davisian-style surface lowering, and his science tended to emphasise surface process over understanding in detail the surface history of a given locality. Penck was German, and during his lifetime his ideas were at times rejected vigorously by the English-speaking geomorphology community. His early death, Davis' dislike for his work, and his at-times-confusing writing style likely all contributed to this rejection.

Both Davis and Penck were trying to place the study of the evolution of the Earth's surface on a more generalized, globally relevant footing than it had been previously. In the early 19th century, authors – especially in Europe – had tended to attribute the form of landscapes to local climate, and in particular to the specific effects of glaciation and periglacial processes. In contrast, both Davis and Penck were seeking to emphasize the importance of evolution of landscapes through time and the generality of the Earth's surface processes across different landscapes under different conditions.

During the early 1900s, the study of regional-scale geomorphology was termed "physiography". Physiography later was considered to be a contraction of "physical" and "geography", and therefore synonymous with physical geography, and the concept became embroiled in controversy surrounding the appropriate concerns of that discipline. Some geomorphologists held to a geological basis for physiography and emphasized a concept of physiographic regions while a conflicting trend among geographers was to equate physiography with "pure morphology", separated from its geological heritage. In the period following World War II, the emergence of process, climatic, and quantitative studies led to a preference by many earth scientists for the term "geomorphology" in order to suggest an analytical approach to landscapes rather than a descriptive one.

=== Climatic geomorphology ===
During the age of New Imperialism in the late 19th century European explorers and scientists traveled across the globe bringing descriptions of landscapes and landforms. As geographical knowledge increased over time these observations were systematized in a search for regional patterns. Climate emerged thus as prime factor for explaining landform distribution at a grand scale. The rise of climatic geomorphology was foreshadowed by the work of Wladimir Köppen, Vasily Dokuchaev and Andreas Schimper. William Morris Davis, the leading geomorphologist of his time, recognized the role of climate by complementing his "normal" temperate climate cycle of erosion with arid and glacial ones. Nevertheless, interest in climatic geomorphology was also a reaction against Davisian geomorphology that was by the mid-20th century considered both un-innovative and dubious. Early climatic geomorphology developed primarily in continental Europe while in the English-speaking world the tendency was not explicit until L.C. Peltier's 1950 publication on a periglacial cycle of erosion.

Climatic geomorphology was criticized in a 1969 review article by process geomorphologist D.R. Stoddart. The criticism by Stoddart proved "devastating" sparking a decline in the popularity of climatic geomorphology in the late 20th century. Stoddart criticized climatic geomorphology for applying supposedly "trivial" methodologies in establishing landform differences between morphoclimatic zones, being linked to Davisian geomorphology and by allegedly neglecting the fact that physical laws governing processes are the same across the globe. In addition some conceptions of climatic geomorphology, like that which holds that chemical weathering is more rapid in tropical climates than in cold climates proved to not be straightforwardly true.

=== Quantitative and process geomorphology ===
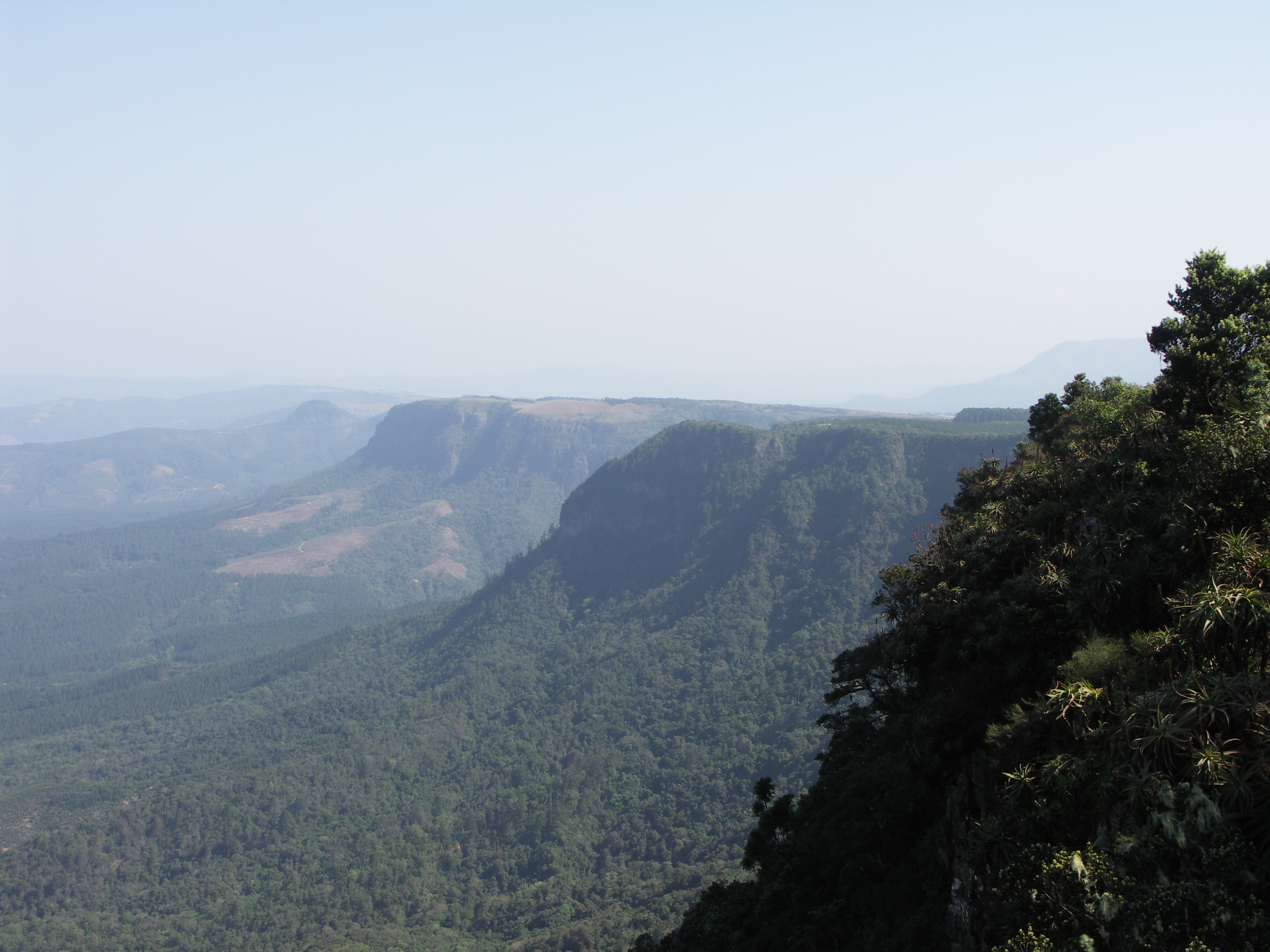
Part of the Great Escarpment in the Drakensberg, southern Africa. This landscape, with its high altitude plateau being incised into by the steep slopes of the escarpment, was cited by Davis as a classic example of his cycle of erosion.

Geomorphology was started to be put on a solid quantitative footing in the middle of the 20th century. Following the early work of Grove Karl Gilbert around the turn of the 20th century, a group of mainly American natural scientists, geologists and hydraulic engineers including William Walden Rubey, Ralph Alger Bagnold, Hans Albert Einstein, Frank Ahnert, John Hack, Luna Leopold, A. Shields, Thomas Maddock, Arthur Strahler, Stanley Schumm, and Ronald Shreve began to research the form of landscape elements such as rivers and hillslopes by taking systematic, direct, quantitative measurements of aspects of them and investigating the scaling of these measurements. These methods began to allow prediction of the past and future behavior of landscapes from present observations, and were later to develop into the modern trend of a highly quantitative approach to geomorphic problems. Many groundbreaking and widely cited early geomorphology studies appeared in the Bulletin of the Geological Society of America, and received only few citations prior to 2000 (they are examples of "sleeping beauties") when a marked increase in quantitative geomorphology research occurred.

Quantitative geomorphology can involve fluid dynamics and solid mechanics, geomorphometry, laboratory studies, field measurements, theoretical work, and full landscape evolution modeling. These approaches are used to understand weathering and the formation of soils, sediment transport, landscape change, and the interactions between climate, tectonics, erosion, and deposition.

In Sweden Filip Hjulström's doctoral thesis, "The River Fyris" (1935), contained one of the first quantitative studies of geomorphological processes ever published. His students followed in the same vein, making quantitative studies of mass transport (Anders Rapp), fluvial transport (Åke Sundborg), delta deposition (Valter Axelsson), and coastal processes (John O. Norrman). This developed into "the Uppsala School of Physical Geography".

=== Contemporary geomorphology ===
Today, the field of geomorphology encompasses a very wide range of different approaches and interests. Modern researchers aim to draw out quantitative "laws" that govern Earth surface processes, but equally, recognize the uniqueness of each landscape and environment in which these processes operate. Particularly important realizations in contemporary geomorphology include:

1) that not all landscapes can be considered as either "stable" or "perturbed", where this perturbed state is a temporary displacement away from some ideal target form. Instead, dynamic changes of the landscape are now seen as an essential part of their nature.

2) that many geomorphic systems are best understood in terms of the stochasticity of the processes occurring in them, that is, the probability distributions of event magnitudes and return times. This in turn has indicated the importance of chaotic determinism to landscapes, and that landscape properties are best considered statistically. The same processes in the same landscapes do not always lead to the same end results.

According to Karna Lidmar-Bergström, regional geography is since the 1990s no longer accepted by mainstream scholarship as a basis for geomorphological studies.

Albeit having its importance diminished, climatic geomorphology continues to exist as field of study producing relevant research. More recently concerns over global warming have led to a renewed interest in the field.

Despite considerable criticism, the cycle of erosion model has remained part of the science of geomorphology. The model or theory has never been proved wrong, but neither has it been proven. The inherent difficulties of the model have instead made geomorphological research to advance along other lines. In contrast to its disputed status in geomorphology, the cycle of erosion model is a common approach used to establish denudation chronologies, and is thus an important concept in the science of historical geology. While acknowledging its shortcomings, modern geomorphologists Andrew Goudie and Karna Lidmar-Bergström have praised it for its elegance and pedagogical value respectively.

== Geomorphological processes ==
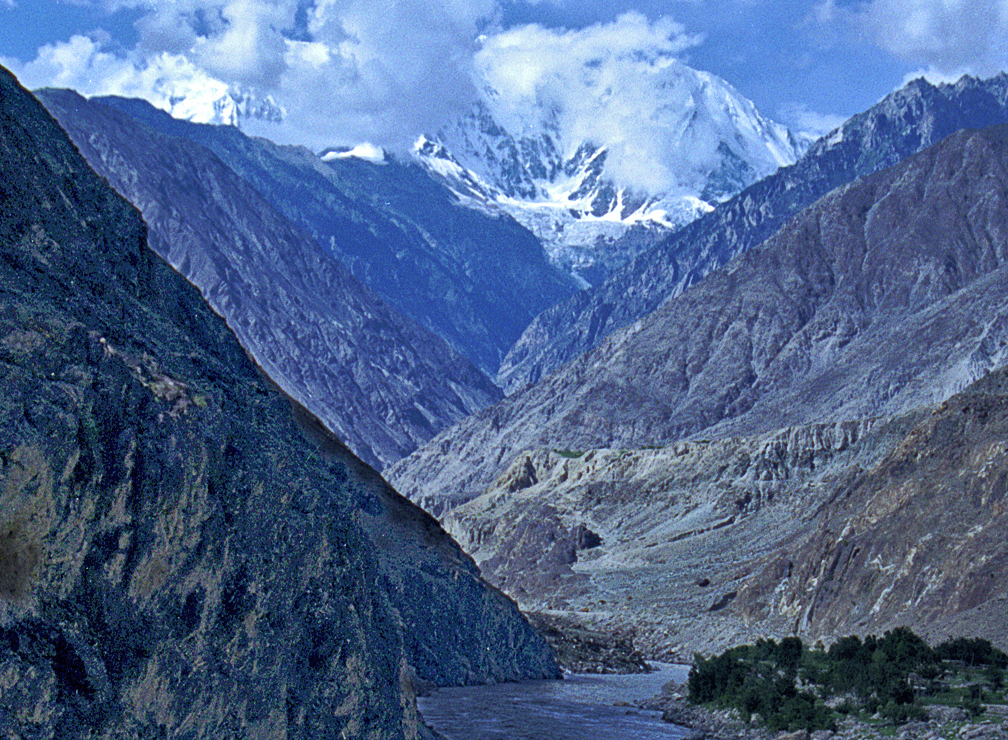
Gorge cut by the Indus River into bedrock, Nanga Parbat region, Pakistan. This is the deepest river canyon in the world. Nanga Parbat itself, the world's 9th highest mountain, is seen in the background.

Geomorphically relevant processes generally fall into (1) the production of regolith by weathering and erosion, (2) the transport of that material, and (3) its eventual deposition. Primary surface processes responsible for most topographic features include wind, waves, chemical dissolution, mass wasting, groundwater movement, surface water flow, glacial action, tectonism, and volcanism. Other more exotic geomorphic processes might include periglacial (freeze-thaw) processes, salt-mediated action, changes to the seabed caused by marine currents, seepage of fluids through the seafloor or extraterrestrial impact.

=== Aeolian processes ===
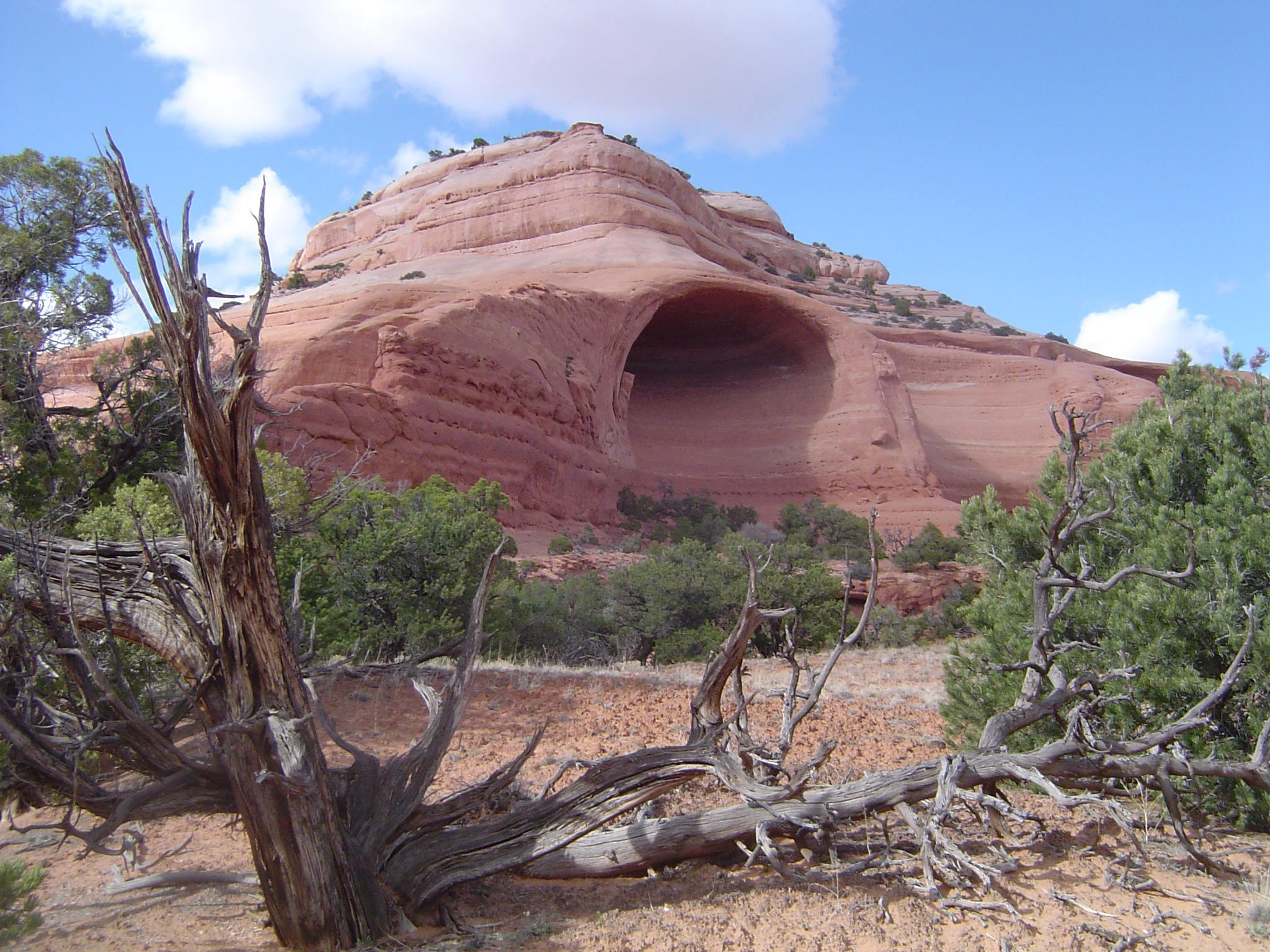
Wind-eroded alcove near Moab, Utah

Aeolian processes pertain to the activity of the winds and more specifically, to the winds' ability to shape the surface of the Earth. Winds may erode, transport, and deposit materials, and are effective agents in regions with sparse vegetation and a large supply of fine, unconsolidated sediments. Although water and mass flow tend to mobilize more material than wind in most environments, aeolian processes are important in arid environments such as deserts.

=== Biological processes ===
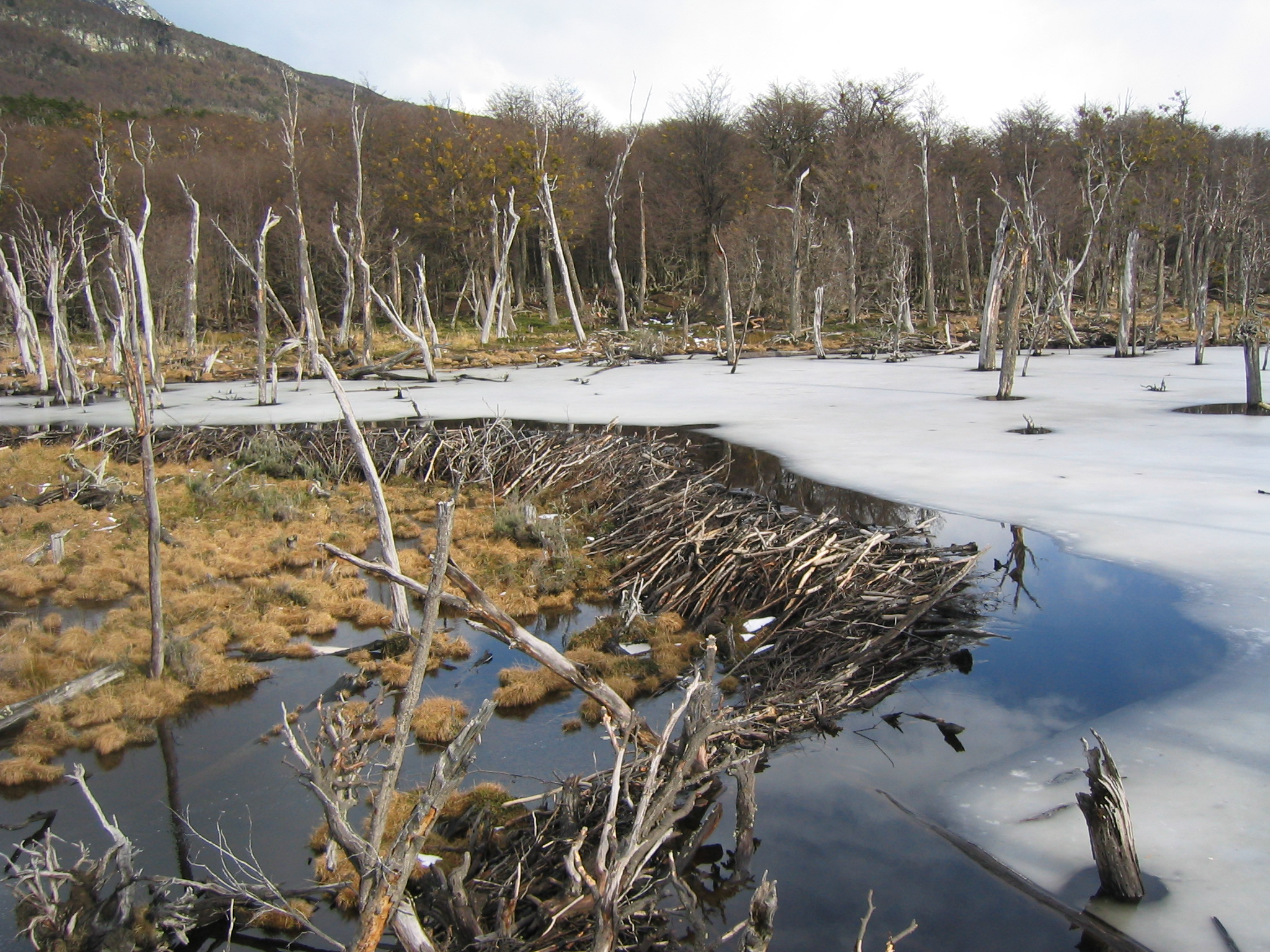
Beaver dams, as this one in Tierra del Fuego, constitute a specific form of zoogeomorphology, a type of biogeomorphology.

The interaction of living organisms with landforms, or biogeomorphologic processes, can be of many different forms, and is probably of profound importance for the terrestrial geomorphic system as a whole. Biology can influence very many geomorphic processes, ranging from biogeochemical processes controlling chemical weathering, to the influence of mechanical processes like burrowing and tree throw on soil development, to even controlling global erosion rates through modulation of climate through carbon dioxide balance. Terrestrial landscapes in which the role of biology in mediating surface processes can be definitively excluded are extremely rare, but may hold important information for understanding the geomorphology of other planets, such as Mars.

=== Fluvial processes ===
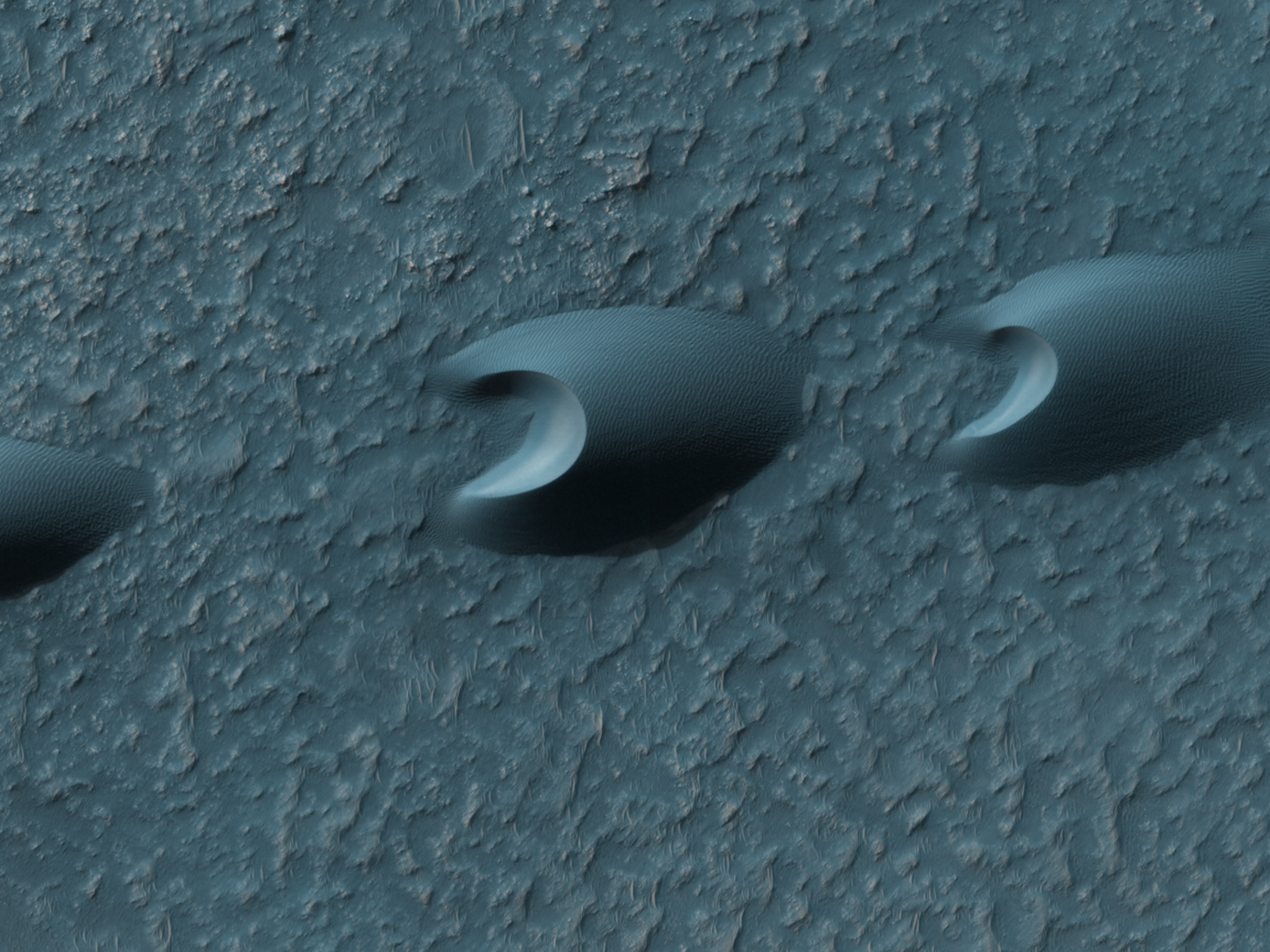
Seif and barchan dunes in the Hellespontus region on the surface of Mars. Dunes are mobile landforms formed by the transport of large volumes of sand by wind.

Rivers and streams are not only conduits of water, but also of sediment. The water, as it flows over the channel bed, is able to mobilize sediment and transport it downstream, either as bed load, suspended load or dissolved load. The rate of sediment transport depends on the availability of sediment itself and on the river's discharge. Rivers are also capable of eroding into rock and forming new sediment, both from their own beds and also by coupling to the surrounding hillslopes. In this way, rivers are thought of as setting the base level for large-scale landscape evolution in nonglacial environments. Rivers are key links in the connectivity of different landscape elements.

As rivers flow across the landscape, they generally increase in size, merging with other rivers. The network of rivers thus formed is a drainage system. These systems take on four general patterns: dendritic, radial, rectangular, and trellis. Dendritic happens to be the most common, occurring when the underlying stratum is stable (without faulting). Drainage systems have four primary components: drainage basin, alluvial valley, delta plain, and receiving basin. Some geomorphic examples of fluvial landforms are alluvial fans, oxbow lakes, and fluvial terraces.

=== Glacial processes ===
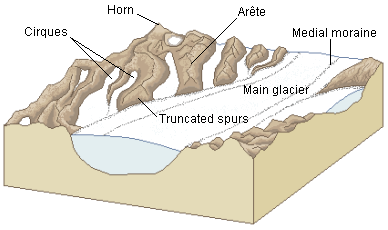
Features of a glacial landscape

Glaciers, while geographically restricted, are effective agents of landscape change. The gradual movement of ice down a valley causes abrasion and plucking of the underlying rock. Abrasion produces fine sediment, termed glacial flour. The debris transported by the glacier, when the glacier recedes, is termed a moraine. Glacial erosion is responsible for U-shaped valleys, as opposed to the V-shaped valleys of fluvial origin.

The way glacial processes interact with other landscape elements, particularly hillslope and fluvial processes, is an important aspect of Plio-Pleistocene landscape evolution and its sedimentary record in many high mountain environments. Environments that have been relatively recently glaciated but are no longer may still show elevated landscape change rates compared to those that have never been glaciated. Nonglacial geomorphic processes which nevertheless have been conditioned by past glaciation are termed paraglacial processes. This concept contrasts with periglacial processes, which are directly driven by formation or melting of ice or frost.

=== Hillslope processes ===
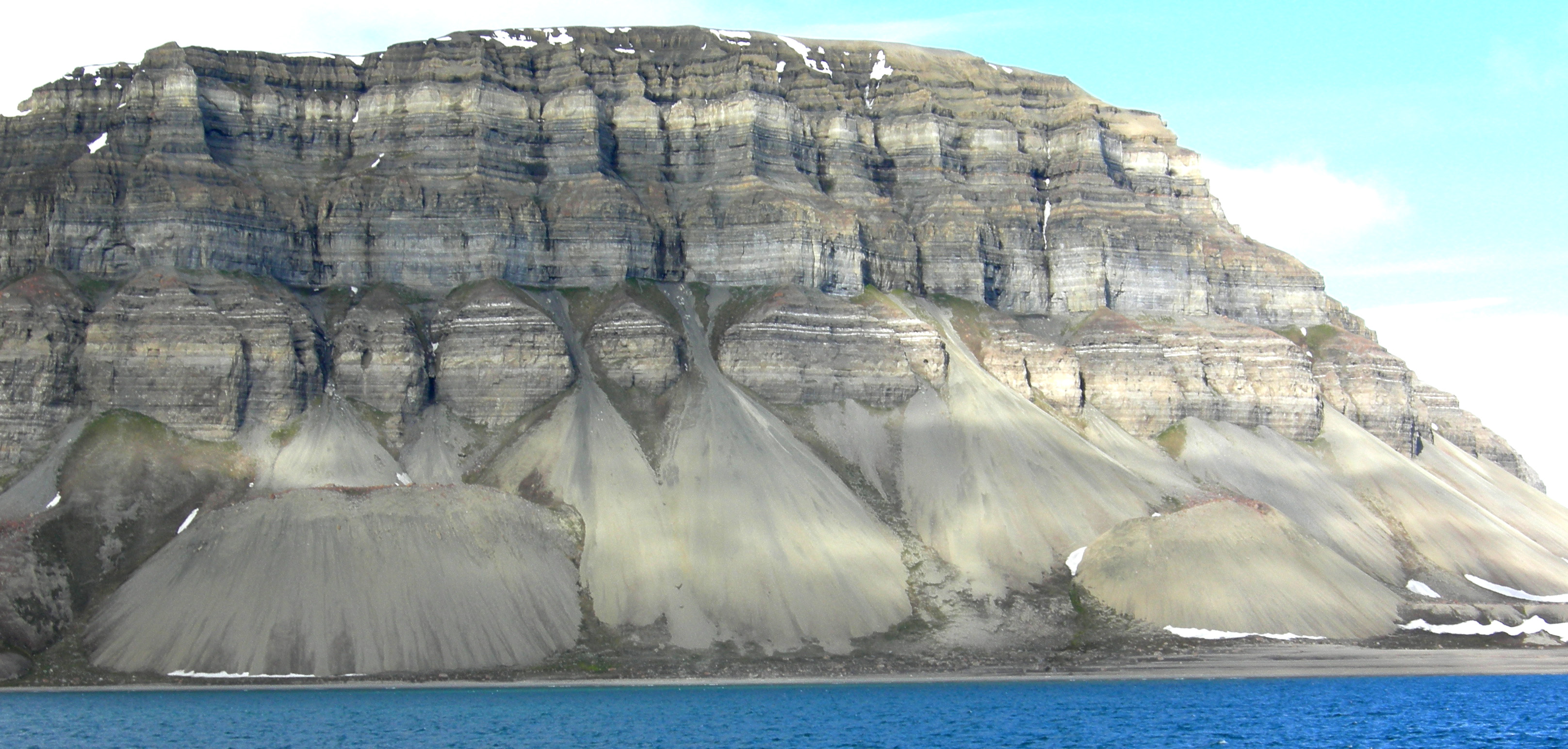
Talus cones on the north shore of Isfjorden, Svalbard, Norway. Talus cones are accumulations of coarse hillslope debris at the foot of the slopes producing the material.

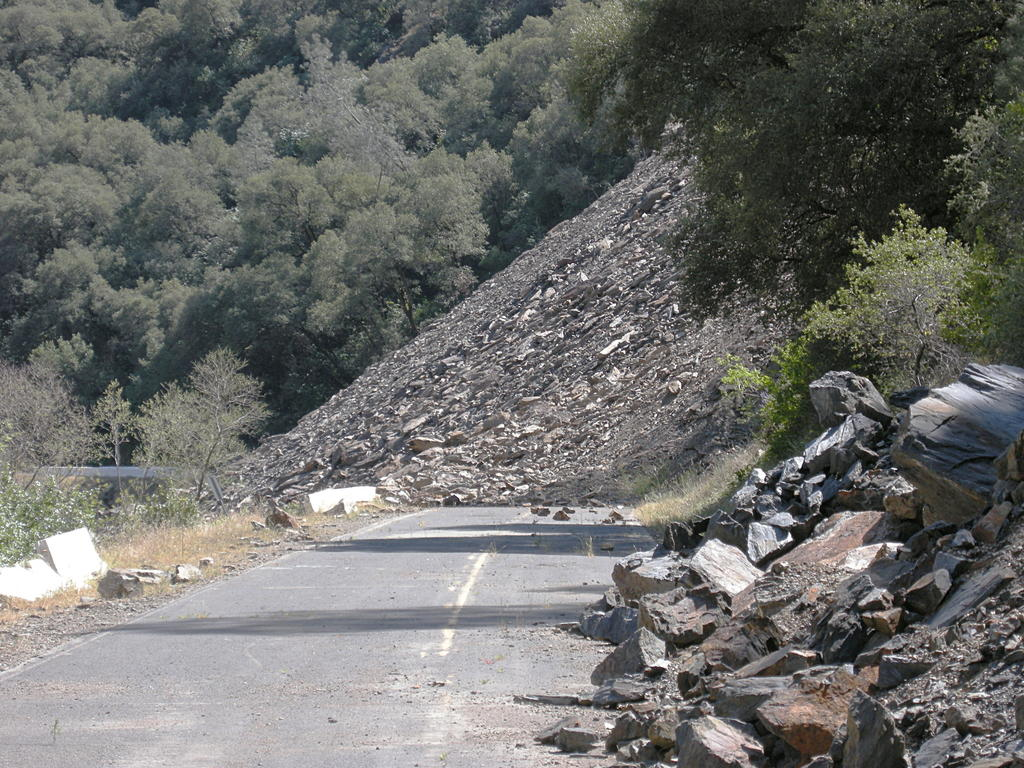
The Ferguson Slide is an active landslide in the Merced River canyon on California State Highway 140, a primary access road to Yosemite National Park.

Soil, regolith, and rock move downslope under the force of gravity via creep, slides, flows, topples, and falls. Such mass wasting occurs on both terrestrial and submarine slopes, and has been observed on Earth, Mars, Venus, Titan and Iapetus.

Ongoing hillslope processes can change the topology of the hillslope surface, which in turn can change the rates of those processes. Hillslopes that steepen up to certain critical thresholds are capable of shedding extremely large volumes of material very quickly, making hillslope processes an extremely important element of landscapes in tectonically active areas.

On the Earth, biological processes such as burrowing or tree throw may play important roles in setting the rates of some hillslope processes.

=== Igneous processes ===
Both volcanic (eruptive) and plutonic (intrusive) igneous processes can have important impacts on geomorphology. The action of volcanoes tends to rejuvenize landscapes, covering the old land surface with lava and tephra, releasing pyroclastic material and forcing rivers through new paths. The cones built by eruptions also build substantial new topography, which can be acted upon by other surface processes. Plutonic rocks intruding then solidifying at depth can cause both uplift or subsidence of the surface, depending on whether the new material is denser or less dense than the rock it displaces.

=== Tectonic processes ===
Tectonic effects on geomorphology can range from scales of millions of years to minutes or less. The effects of tectonics on landscape are heavily dependent on the nature of the underlying bedrock fabric that more or less controls what kind of local morphology tectonics can shape. Earthquakes can, in terms of minutes, submerge large areas of land forming new wetlands. Isostatic rebound can account for significant changes over hundreds to thousands of years, and allows erosion of a mountain belt to promote further erosion as mass is removed from the chain and the belt uplifts. Long-term plate tectonic dynamics give rise to orogenic belts, large mountain chains with typical lifetimes of many tens of millions of years, which form focal points for high rates of fluvial and hillslope processes and thus long-term sediment production.

Features of deeper mantle dynamics such as plumes and delamination of the lower lithosphere have also been hypothesised to play important roles in the long term (> million year), large scale (thousands of km) evolution of the Earth's topography (see dynamic topography). Both can promote surface uplift through isostasy as hotter, less dense, mantle rocks displace cooler, denser, mantle rocks at depth in the Earth.

=== Marine processes ===
Marine processes are those associated with the action of waves, marine currents and seepage of fluids through the seafloor. Mass wasting and submarine landsliding are also important processes for some aspects of marine geomorphology. Because ocean basins are the ultimate sinks for a large fraction of terrestrial sediments, depositional processes and their related forms (e.g., sediment fans, deltas) are particularly important as elements of marine geomorphology.

== Overlap with other fields ==
There is a considerable overlap between geomorphology and other fields. Deposition of material is extremely important in sedimentology. Weathering is the chemical and physical disruption of earth materials in place on exposure to atmospheric or near surface agents, and is typically studied by soil scientists and environmental chemists, but is an essential component of geomorphology because it is what provides the material that can be moved in the first place. Civil and environmental engineers are concerned with erosion and sediment transport, especially related to canals, slope stability (and natural hazards), water quality, coastal environmental management, transport of contaminants, and stream restoration. Glaciers can cause extensive erosion and deposition in a short period of time, making them extremely important entities in the high latitudes and meaning that they set the conditions in the headwaters of mountain-born streams; glaciology therefore is important in geomorphology.

== See also ==
- Bioerosion
- Biogeology
- Biogeomorphology
- Biorhexistasy
- British Society for Geomorphology
- Coastal biogeomorphology
- Coastal erosion
- Concepts and Techniques in Modern Geography
- Drainage system (geomorphology)
- Erosion prediction
- Geologic modelling
- Geological shoulder
- Geomorphometry
- Geotechnics
- Hack's law
- Hydrologic modeling, behavioral modeling in hydrology
- List of landforms
- Orogeny
- Physiographic regions of the world
- Sediment transport
- Soil morphology
- Soils retrogression and degradation
- Stream capture
- Thermochronology
