= Kirk Bryan (geologist) =

American geologist

- Born: 22 July 1888; Albuquerque, New Mexico Territory
- Died: 22 August 1950 (aged 62); Cody, Wyoming
- Education: Yale University
- Children: Kirk Bryan Jr.
- Scientific career
- Fields: geology
- Doctoral students: Luna Leopold; John Tilton Hack

Kirk Bryan (22 July 1888 in Albuquerque, New Mexico Territory – 22 August 1950 in Cody, Wyoming) was an American geologist on the faculty of Harvard University from 1925 until his death in 1950.

The son of R.W.D. Bryan (Astronomer under Hall in the Polaris expedition), Bryan received his undergraduate education at the University of New Mexico and later obtained a Ph.D. from Yale University.

A geomorphologist, he worked primarily in arid regions, and was one of the pioneers in explaining the forces that formed landmasses in those areas.

According to Luna Leopold, one of his students, Bryan was influential as a teacher. In 2004, Leopold wrote:

His students made important advances in a variety of subjects, including alluvial chronology, periglacial and glacial geology, wind action, soil and vegetative effects on landscape development, and archaeology. His influence is indicated by the fact that of the four geologists who have received the National Medal of Science, three were students of Kirk Bryan.

The Geological Society of America's Kirk Bryan Award is named in his honour. It is awarded annually in recognition of a publication of distinction advancing the science of geomorphology or Quaternary geology, which were Bryan's areas of specialization.

== Publications ==
Bryan was a prolific writer. This is a partial list of his scientific contributions:

- 1925. Date of channel trenching (arroyo cutting) in the arid Southwest. Science 62(1607): 338–344.
- 1927. Channel erosion of the Rio Salado, Socorro County, New Mexico. U.S. Geological Survey Bulletin 79: 15–19.
- 1928. Historic evidence on changes in the channel of Rio Puerco, a tributary of the Rio Grande in New Mexico. Journal of Geology 36(3): 265–282.
- 1928. Change in plant associations by change in ground water level. Ecology 9(4): 474–478.
- 1929. Flood-water farming. Geographical Review 19:444–456.
- 1929. Folsom culture and its age. Geological Society of America Bulletin 40:128-129.
- 1938. Prehistoric quarries and implements of pre-Amerindian aspect in New Mexico. Science (new series) 87 (229): 343–346.
- 1941. Geologic antiquity of man in America. Science 93 (2422): 505-514.
- K. Bryan and C.C. Albritton. 1943. Soil phenomena as evidence of climate changes. American Journal of Science 241: 469-490.
- 1950. The Place of Geomorphology in the Geographic Sciences. Annals of the Association of American Geographers, Vol. 40, No. 3 (Sep., 1950), pp. 196–208
