= Tephriphonolite =

Type of igneous rock

Tephriphonolite or tephri-phonolite is a mafic to intermediate extrusive igneous rock in composition between phonotephrite and phonolite. It contains 9–14% alkali content and 48–57% silica content (see TAS diagram). Tephriphonolite is roughly equivalent to tephritic phonolite of the QAPF classification.

Tephriphonolite has been found, for example, at Colli Albani volcano in Italy and in the Asunción Rift of Paraguay.
