= Biogeomorphology =

Study of interactions between organisms and the development of landforms

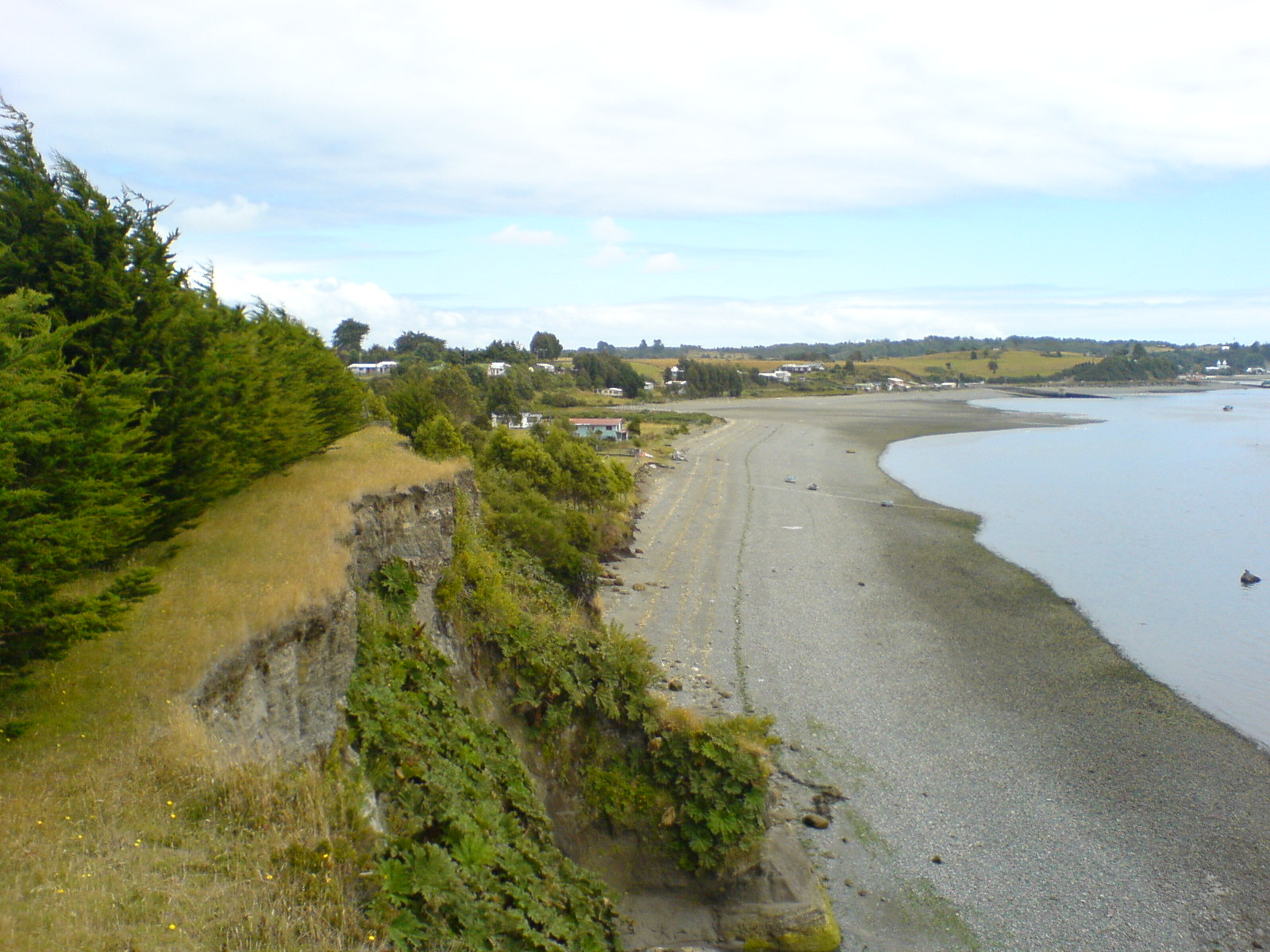
Slope stabilization by Chilean rhubarb on the coasts of Chacao Channel. Vegetation have mostly a protective effect on slopes.

Biogeomorphology and ecogeomorphology are the study of interactions between organisms and the development of landforms, and are thus fields of study within geomorphology and ichnology. Organisms affect geomorphic processes in a variety of ways. For example, trees can reduce landslide potential where their roots penetrate to underlying rock, plants and their litter inhibit soil erosion, biochemicals produced by plants accelerate the chemical weathering of bedrock and regolith, and marine animals cause the bioerosion of coral. The study of the interactions between marine biota and coastal landform processes is called coastal biogeomorphology.

Phytogeomorphology is an aspect of biogeomorphology that deals with the narrower subject of how terrain affects plant growth. In recent years a large number of articles have appeared in the literature dealing with how terrain attributes affect crop growth and yield in farm fields, and while they don't use the term phytogeomorphology the dependencies are the same. Precision agriculture models where crop variability is at least partially defined by terrain attributes can be considered as phytogeomorphological precision agriculture.

== Overview ==
Biogeomorphology is a multidisciplinary focus of geomorphology that takes research approaches from both geomorphology and ecology. It is a sub discipline of geomorphology. Biogeomorphology can be synthesized into two distinct approaches:

1. The influences that geomorphology plays on the biodiversity and distribution of flora and fauna.

2. The influences that biotic factors have on the way landforms are developed.

There has been much work on these approaches such as; the effect that parent material has on the distribution of plants, the increase of precipitation due to an influx of transpiration, the stability of a hillslope due to the abundance of vegetation or, the increase of sedimentation due to a beaver dam. Biogeomorphology shows the axiomatic relationship between certain land forming processes and biotic factors. That is, certain geomorphic processes shape the biota and biotic factors can shape land forming processes.

== Origins and early work ==
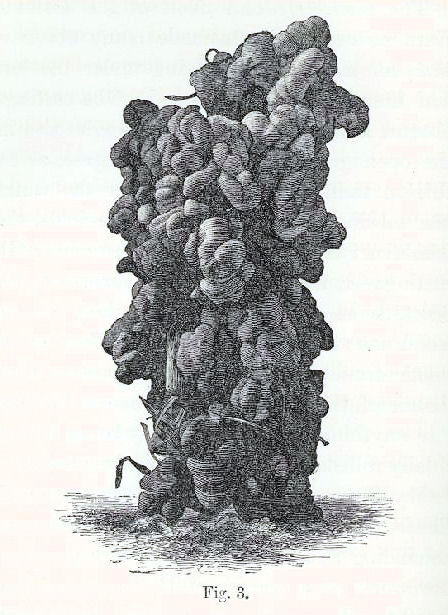
Figure 3 of Darwin's work on earthworms, the caption of which reads "A tower-like casting, probably ejected by a species of Perichæta, from the Botanic Garden, Calcutta : of natural size, engraved from a photograph."

The earliest work related to biogeomorphology was Charles Darwin's 1881 book titled The Formation of Vegetable Mould through the Action of Worms. Although the field of biogeomorphology had not yet been named, Darwin's work represents the earliest examination of a faunal organism influencing landscape process and form. Charles Darwin begins his work on worms with an examination of behavior and physiology, which then moves towards topics related to geomorphology, pedogenesis, and bioturbation. Observations and measurements of soil moved by earthworms, and emphasis on the role of earthworms in formation of humus, fertility of soils, and mixing of soils were all described in the book, which began to change the perspective on earthworms from pest to critical agent of pedogenesis. Despite the popularity of Darwin's final work, the scientific community was slow to recognize the significance of examining the role of organisms in influencing landscapes.

It wasn't until the late twentieth century that biogeomorphology began attracting the attention of more than a handful of researchers.

== Research approaches ==
There are two approaches to research in biogeomorphology. One is through the statistical and empirically derived means. This is an approach commonly used in the fields of ecology and biology. The approach is simply to employ large replication studies and deriving patterns from statistical data. Whereas taking a more geomorphic research approach tends to derive patterns via theoretic knowledge and detailed measurements of multiple factors. In turn, this uses smaller sample sizes than that of large replication studies.

== Biogeomorphological processes ==
There are several biogeomorphological processes. Bioerosion is the weathering and removal of abiotic material via organic processes. This can either be passive or active. Moreover, bioerosion is the chemical and or the mechanical weathering of landforms due to organic means. Bioprotection is essentially the effect that organisms have on reducing the action of geomorphic processes. Best shown by algae covering a rock surface acts as a buffer from the waves erosive work. Bioconstruction refers to bioconstructors or ecosystem engineers. Ecosystem engineers are organisms that build mounds, dams, reefs &c. More specifically they are organisms that change the environment physically, directly or indirectly controlling the abundance of resources available in the environment accessible to organisms.

== Themes of complex systems in biogeomorphology ==
There are four main themes that underline the complex systems within biogeomorphology. The first of which is multiple casualty. Multiple casualty is the way in which biota is deposited. More specifically, multiple casualty is caused by various processes. That is, processes such as fires, floods and hillslope instability directly or indirectly determining the distribution of flora and in turn fauna. Ecosystem engineers are another theme underlying complex system of biogeomorphology. These organisms have the most profound effect on the overall ecosystem structure. Some of the most common ecosystem engineers are earthworms. Earthworms aid in the production of humus and increase both soil aeration and area for roots and root hairs to utilize. With more space for roots, this can increase soil stability. Another strong example of ecosystem engineers are beavers. Beavers can increase the sedimentation in a channel as well as increase runoff rates due to a reduction of vegetative cover needed to build their dams. Ecological topology is another theme of complex systems in biogeomorphology. This theme focuses on how the biota varies based on geographic location. This ecological topology is controlled by a concept called stability domain. Stability domain describes the interaction of a set species and certain abiotic factors that act as a medium to the function and structure of an environment. The final of the four underlying themes of the complex systems in biogeomorphology is ecological memory. Ecological memory is where certain biotic and abiotic factors have a recursive relationship and therefore can be encoded in organisms and the immediate environment. An example of this can simply be the flame retardant properties in the bark of Coastal Sequoias due to the recurrence of fires

== Climate change ==
Biogeomorphology and ecogeomorphology can aid with assessing the impacts of global climate change. This can especially be seen in coastal and estuarine systems due to; sea level rise, increased global temperatures, increased sea temperature, a higher frequency in and intensity of storms, and varying distributions of precipitation. Biogeomorphology can outline some of the effects of climate change due to biocomplexity. Biocomplexity is in reference to the complex way in which organisms interact with their environment and its effect on biodiversity. Using statistical data, one can derive how these environmental changes will affect the biodiversity of different trophic levels and different keystone species.

== See also ==
- Biogeology
- Biogeophysics
- Coastal biogeomorphology
- Phytogeomorphology

== Bibliography ==
- Viles, Heather (1988). Biogeomorphology. Oxford: Basil Blackwell. ISBN 978-0-631-15405-1.
- Hupp (1995). Biogeomorphology, Terrestrial and Freshwater Systems. ISBN 978-0-444-81867-6.
- Osterkamp, W.R.; Friedman, J.M. (1997). "Research Considerations for Biogeomorphology". Proceedings of the U.S. Geological Survey (USGS) Sediment Workshop 'Expanding Sediment Research Capabilities in Today's USGS'. Reston, VA, and Harpers Ferry, WV.
