= John Tilton Hack =

American geologist and geomorphologist

- Born: 1913
- Died: 1991 (aged 77–78)
- Education: Harvard University
- Known for: Hack's law; dynamic equilibrium in landscapes
- Scientific career
- Fields: Geology; Geomorphology
- Workplaces: United States Geological Survey
- Doctoral advisor: Kirk Bryan

John Tilton Hack (1913–1991) was an American geologist and geomorphologist known for his contributions to establish the dynamic equilibrium concept in landscapes. Hack's law, concerning the empirical relationship between the length of streams and the area of their basins, is named after him.

Hack was a student of Kirk Bryan. Hack graduated from Harvard University, where he received his bachelor's and master's degrees and doctorate in geomorphology. He retired from the United States Geological Survey in 1981.
