= Geological shoulder =

Uplift of terrain

Formation of rift shoulders during the process of oceanisation.

In geology, a geological shoulder or rift shoulder is an area of uplifted terrain resulting from the compensatory movement of large-scale tectonic processes. These features are distinct from reliefs caused by compressional tectonics, as they arise from extensional forces rather than compression.

== Geological shoulder ==
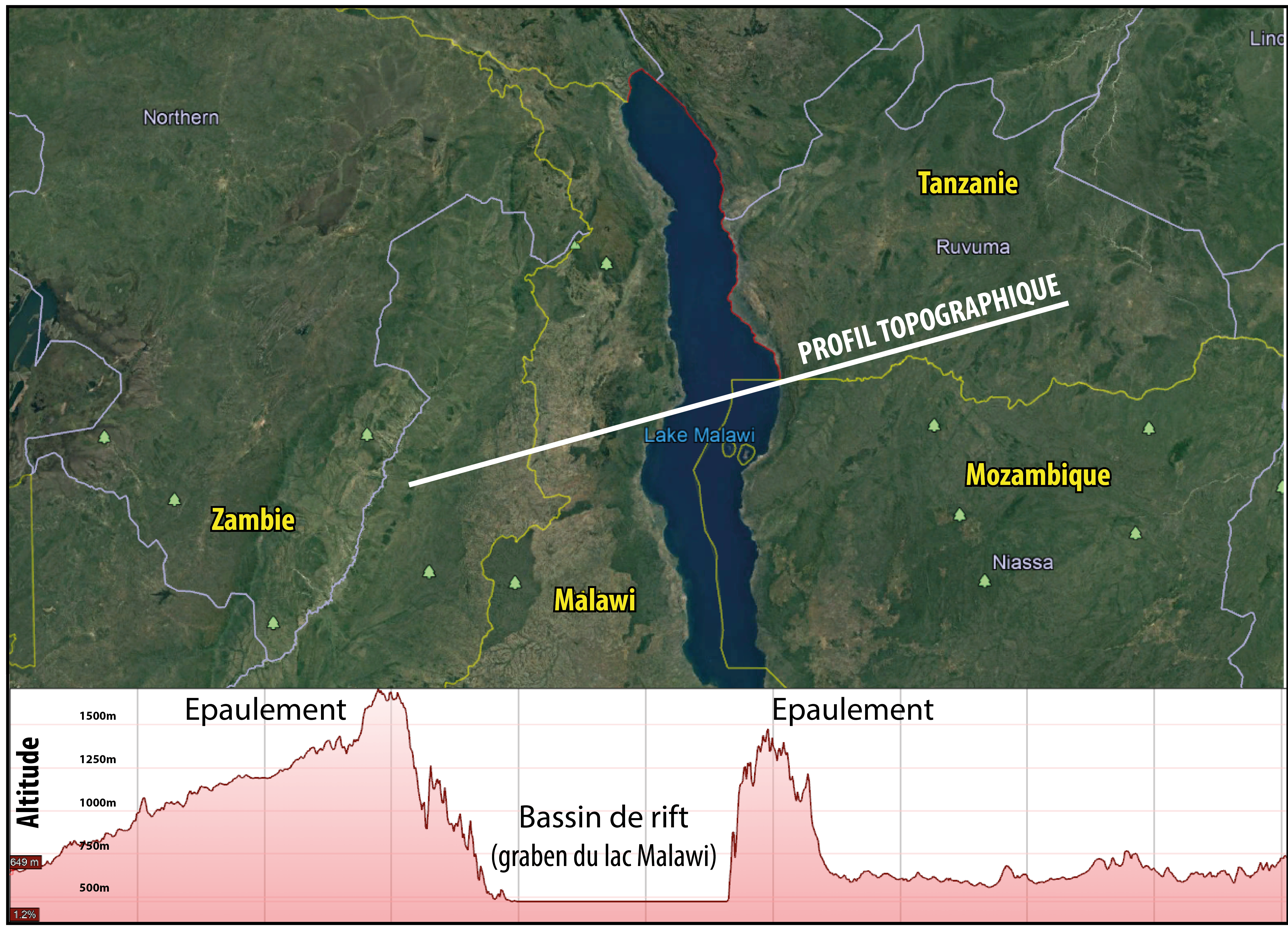
Topographic profile of the rift shoulders of Lake Malawi.

Rift shoulders are significant topographic features, often reaching elevations of several kilometers, that form mountainous belts along the edges of central rift depressions. The origin of these shoulders has been the subject of extensive research since the 1980s. The isostatic compensation model proposed by Felix Andries Vening Meinesz in 1950, also known as the isostatic or flexural rebound model, explains the permanent topographic uplift that occurs during rifting and persists on passive margins despite erosion. This model is complemented by additional theories that account for factors such as creep, mantle magma underplating, or dynamic support. These explore the influence of rheological parameters, extension rates, crustal thickness, and fault geometry in greater detail.

== Examples ==
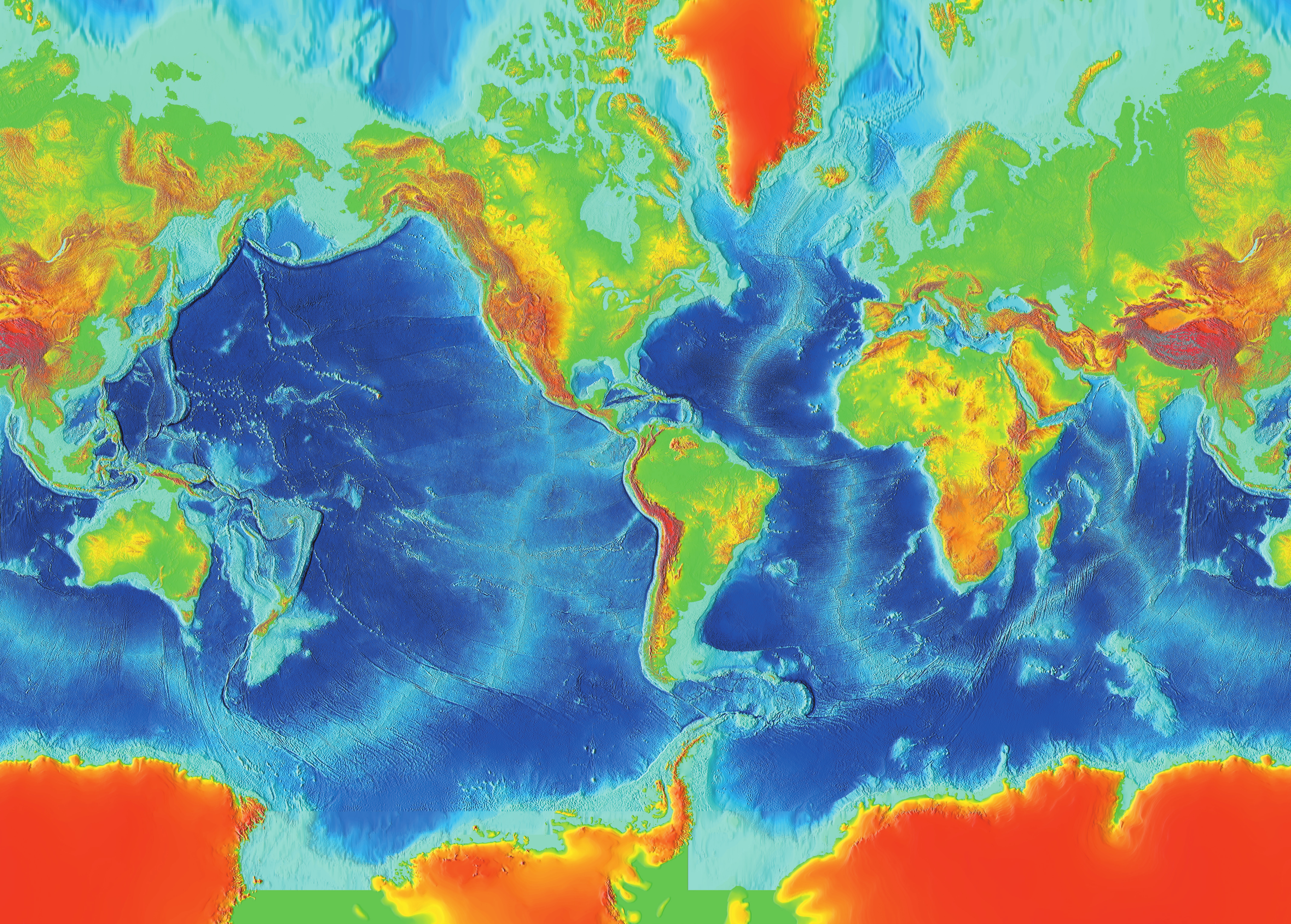
Major geological shoulders on Earth's surface (NOAA).

Examples of geological shoulders are:

- Geological shoulders of the East African Rift;
- Margins of the Red Sea;
- Cantabrian Mountains and Armorican Massif, forming the shoulders of the Bay of Biscay;
- Passive margins of the Atlantic Ocean: northern eastern Greenland and western Scandinavia;
- Passive margins of the Mascarene Basin (resulting from Indo-Madagascan rifting): eastern Madagascar and western India.

These examples highlight the global distribution of geological shoulders and their association with major tectonic features.

== See also ==
- Geomorphology
- Mantle convection
