= Asunción Rift =

The Asunción Rift is a composite graben and rift in eastern Paraguay. The rift is at some localities filled with up to 2500 m of sediments. The rift has a width of 40 to 25 km and can be divided in three segments. The western segment has a NW-SE strike and runs a length of over 90 km between the localities of Benjamin Aceval and Paraguarí. The central section runs from Paraguarí to Villarrica in an E-W direction and has a length of 70 km. The eastern section has a NW-SE orientation and a length of 40 km and runs from Villarrica to the Ybytyruzú Mountains.
