= Laumann =

Laumann is a surname. Its Latvian form is Laumanis and Laumane. Notable people with the name include:

- Arthur Laumann (1894–1970), German World War I flying aces
- Daniele Laumann (born 1961), Canadian rower
- Edward Laumann (born 1938), American sociologist
- Facundo Laumann
- Joseph Laumann (born 1983), German footballer
- Karl-Josef Laumann (born 1957), German politician
- Martin Laumann Ylven (born 1988), Norwegian ice hockey player
- Silken Laumann (born 1964), Canadian rower
- Fricis Laumanis

== See also ==
- Schönberger-Laumann 1892, Austrian semi-automatic pistol
