= Paper with delayed recognition =

A paper with delayed recognition (or a "sleeping beauty") is a publication that received very little attention (receiving few citations) shortly after publication, but later receives a dramatic increase in citations. For example, an 1884 article by Charles Sanders Peirce was rarely cited until about the year 2000, but has since garnered many citations.

The phenomenon has been studied in bibliometrics and scientometrics.

A 2015 study published in the Proceedings of the National Academy of Sciences concluded, after looking at over 22 million scientific papers of the prior 100 years, that "sleeping beauties are common", and seen even in the works of the most famous scientists. In particular, that a paper on an aspect of quantum mechanics that was published in 1935 by Albert Einstein, Boris Podolsky and Nathan Rosen, did not receive widespread attention until 1994. In the top 15 such papers in science, identified in the study, the delay for recognition was often 50 to 100 years.

== Sleeping Beauties Studies ==
Since van Raan's 2004 paper, the Sleeping Beauties metaphor developed into more focused research area with investigations and comparative analyses of Sleeping Beauties in specific areas. The paper highlighted (1) depth of sleep, (2) length of the sleep and (3) awake intensity. A 'Sleeping Beauty' paper, asleep for an extended duration is awakened by a 'Prince'. The depth of sleep may be deep (very long) or light.

In 2020, Moodley, Hernández Serrano, Dijck and Dumontier investigated the presence and features of sleeping beauties in case law from the Court of Justice of the European Union. Preliminary findings indicate that the B-coefficient could be a potential candidate for an additional measure of case relevance in the legal sphere.

A recent investigation of Sleeping Beauties in Innovation Studies found only 8 Sleeping Beauties out of 52,373 relevant papers obtained via the Web of Science. This study found that "highly influential authors and self-awakening mechanisms were critical triggers for bringing SBs into scientific notoriety".

Sleeping Beauties are found to be rather rare in Psychology. A recent study by Yuh-Shan Ho and James Hartley found only three sleeping beauties in 303,255 relevant psychology papers.

Jian Du and Yishan Wu find that. Du and Wu suggest that Sleeping Beauties "may need one or more Princes and even "retinues” to be “awakened.”

Recent findings by van Raan and Winnink, indicate that technological innovations are reducing the length of sleep period, especially as associated with patenting activities. More so when waking is performed by a ‘technological prince'. A similar result was found in analyzing publications in medical research

== Premature Discoveries and Postmature Discoveries ==
Many, but not all, Sleeping Beauties are premature. Many, but not all Premature Discoveries are Sleeping Beauties.

Gunther Stent introduced the term "premature discovery" in 1972.

Premature Discovery:

Proposed by molecular biologist Gunther Stent in 1972, a discovery is considered premature if its implications cannot be connected to contemporary canonical knowledge by a simple series of logical steps. Because the scientific community lacks the conceptual framework to validate it, the discovery is usually resisted, ignored, or forgotten for decades.

• The Core Mechanism: The scientific community neglects the idea not out of malice, but to avoid being overwhelmed by unprovable or wild hypotheses.

• Famous Example: Gregor Mendel’s 1866 laws of genetic inheritance. His work was entirely ignored for 34 years because 19th-century biologists lacked the understanding of chromosomes and cell division necessary to make sense of his mathematical ratios.

Harriet Zuckerman and Joshua Lederberg coined the term "postmature discovery" in 1986.

Post-Mature Discovery:

Coined by sociologist Harriet Zuckerman and Nobel laureate Joshua Lederberg, a post-mature discovery refers to a breakthrough that was delayed or deterred despite all necessary data and technology being available. Scientists had the tools and information to make the discovery much earlier, but some cognitive or social hindrance blocked them from seeing what was right in front of them.

• The Core Mechanism: While premature discoveries suffer from delayed recognition, post-mature discoveries suffer from delayed discovery. The idea is simply "missed" by a generation of researchers.

• Famous Example: The discovery of bacterial conjugation (how bacteria exchange genetic material) by Lederberg and Edward Tatum in 1946. The technology and biological samples required to observe this had been standard in laboratories for decades, yet the discovery was delayed because scientists firmly believed bacteria lacked sexual recombination.
