= Hack's law =

Hydrological relationship

Hack's law is an empirical relationship between the length of streams and the area of their basins. If L is the length of the longest stream in a basin, and A is the area of the basin, then Hack's law may be written as

$$L = C A^h\$$

for some constant C where the exponent h is slightly less than 0.6 in most basins. h varies slightly from region to region and slightly decreases for larger basins (>8,000 mi^{2}, or 20,720 km^{2}). In addition to the catchment-scales, Hack's law was observed on unchanneled small-scale surfaces when the morphology measured at high resolutions (Cheraghi et al., 2018).

River deltas' distributary networks also follow Hack's law, where their longest channel length scales with their nourishment area, the counterpart of drainage area in river tributary networks, in the same way (Dong et al., Science, 2026).

The law is named after American geomorphologist John Tilton Hack.
