= Phytogeomorphology =

Phytogeomorphology is the study of how terrain features affect plant growth. It was the subject of a treatise by Howard and Mitchell in 1985, who were considering the growth and varietal temporal and spatial variability found in forests, but recognized that their work also had application to farming, and the relatively new science (at that time) of precision agriculture. The premise of Howard and Mitchell is that landforms, or features of the land's 3D topography significantly affect how and where plants (or trees in their case) grow. Since that time, the ability to map and classify landform shapes and features has increased greatly. The advent of GPS has made it possible to map almost any variable one might wish to measure. Thus, a very increased awareness of the spatial variability of the environment that plants grow in has arisen. The development of technology like airborne LiDAR has enabled the detailed measurement of landform features to better than sub-meter, and when combined with RTK-GPS (accuracies to 1mm) enables the creation of very accurate maps of where these features are. Comparison of these landform maps with mapping of variables related to crop or plant growth show a strong correlation (see below for examples and references for precision agriculture).

== Phytogeomorphology and Precision Agriculture ==
While phytogeomorphology studies the relationship between plants and terrain attributes in general (see Howard et al., (1985)), it can also apply to precision agriculture by studying crop growth temporal and spatial variability within farm fields. There is already a volume of work, although they don't use the term phytogeomorphology specifically, that considers farm field terrain attributes as affecting crop yield and growth, Moore et al. (1991) provide an early overview of the application of terrain features to precision agriculture, but one of the earliest references to this phenomenon in farming is that of Whittaker in 1967. More recent work includes a six-year study of temporal and spatial yield stability over 11 years (Kaspar et al., (2003), and references therein), and a detailed study of the same on a small patch farm in Portugal (and references therein). This variability can be exploited to produce higher yields and reduce the environmental impact of farming - consequently returning a higher profit to the farmer in terms of higher overall yields and lesser amounts of inputs. The new science of Sustainable Intensification of Agriculture which is addressing the need for higher yields from existing fields can be fulfilled by some of the practical applications of phytogeomorphology applied to precision agriculture.

Work in this area has been happening for some years (see Reuter et al., (2005), Marquas de Silva et al., (2008), and especially Moore et al., (1991)), but it is slow and sometimes tedious work that necessarily involves multiple years of data, very specialized software tools, and long compute times to produce the resulting maps.

== Phytogeomorphologically defined Management Zones ==
Typically, the objective of precision agriculture is to divide the farm field into distinct management zones based on yield performance at each point in the field. 'Variable rate technology' is a relatively new term in farming technology that refers to spreaders, seeders, sprayers, etc. that are able to adjust their rates of flow on the fly. The idea is to create a 'recipe map' for variable rate farm machinery to deliver the exact quantity of amendments required at that location (within that zone of the field). The literature is divided on how to properly define management zones.

In the geomorphological approach to defining management zones it is found that topography aids in at least partially defining how much yield comes from which part of the field. This is true in fields where there are permanently limiting characteristics to parts of the field, but not true in fields where the growth potential is the same all over the field (Blackmore et al., (2003)). It can be shown that an index map of yield (shows areas of consistent over-performance of yield and areas of consistent under-performance) correlates well with a landform classification map (personal communication, Aspinall (2011)). Landforms can be classified a number of ways, but the simplest to use software tool is LandMapR (MacMillan (2003)). An early version of the LandMapR software is available through the Opengeomorphometry project hosted under the Google Code project.
